Various real-world aircraft have long made significant appearances in fictional works, including books, films, toys, TV programs, video games, and other media.

History 
The first aviation film was the 1911 William J. Humphrey–directed two-reeler, The Military Air-Scout, shot after an Aero Club of America flying meet at Long Island, New York. The stunt flying was done by Lt. Henry Arnold, "who picked up 'a few extra bucks' for his services" and "became so excited about movies that he almost quit the Army to become an actor."

The years between World War I and World War II saw extensive use of aircraft, a new technology, in film, a new medium. In the early 1920s, Hollywood studios made dozens of now-obscure "aerial Westerns" with leads such as Tom Mix and Hoot Gibson, where the role of the horse was taken by aircraft, or used aircraft as nothing more than vehicles for stunts to excite audiences. In 1926, the first "proper" aviation film was made; Wings is a story of two pilots who sign up to fly and fight in the Great War. Made with the co-operation of the United States' then-Department of War (a relationship that continues to this day), it used front-line military aircraft of the day such as the Thomas-Morse MB-3 and Boeing PW-9, flown by military pilots. Future U.S. Air Force generals Hap Arnold and Hoyt Vandenberg were among the military officers involved with the production: Arnold as a technical consultant and Vandenberg as one of the pilots. Wings was a box-office hit when it achieved general release in 1929 and went on to win the award for Best Production at the first Academy Awards.

In Fascist Italy in the 1930s, aviation-themed films were used as propaganda tools to complement the massed flights led by Italo Balbo in promoting the regime domestically and abroad. One such film was the most successful Italian film of the pre-World War II era; Luciano Serra pilota (Luciano Serra, Pilot) was inextricably linked to the Fascist government via Mussolini's son Vittorio, who was the driving force behind the film's production. The film, set between 1921 and the Italo-Abyssinian War, was used to compare the allegedly moribund state of aviation in pre-Fascist Italy with the purported power of the Regia Aeronautica and Italian aviation in general in the 1930s. However, by the time that Luciano Serra pilota was shown at the 1938 Venice Film Festival, the link between aviation and Fascism had already been firmly established in the minds of the Italian people through widespread depictions of aircraft in a variety of media. For example, there was an entire branch of the Futurist Art movement devoted to aviation, known as Aeropittura ("Aeropainting"). While many of the Aeropittura works were devoted to flight rather than aircraft per se, some did celebrate Italian aviation exploits, such as Alfredo Ambrosi's Il volo su Vienna (The Flight over Vienna) which depicted in Futurist style the World War I exploit of Gabriele d'Annunzio; although the city of Vienna is shown in abstract in accordance with the aims of Aeropittura – namely to show the dynamism and excitement of flight – the Ansaldo SVA aircraft are  carefully and accurately rendered.

The U.S. military controls whether its aircraft may be used for movie or video production. Requests for such use must be accompanied by the proposed production's script, allowing military officials to withhold aircraft when they believe the work will not portray the U.S. military in a sufficiently positive light. Because alternatives to using real military aircraft can be expensive, films that do not get U.S. military approval often do not get financed or made. Sean McElwee, writing for Salon.com, concluded of this problem,

This is a prima facie case for de facto censorship...If the government wants to allow its equipment to be used by studios, it needs to grant access to anyone who wants to use it – that is the meaning of pluralism. The Pentagon fears that some of the movies may hurt the military's reputation and recruiting efforts. These concerns are legitimate, but it's more important that we allow John Stuart Mill's 'market place of ideas' to be a place for free trade, rather than favoring some over others.

Aircraft have also appeared in television miniseries and series around the world. These include the American productions Twelve O'Clock High, Airwolf, Baa Baa Black Sheep, Sky King and Wings; the Australian series Big Sky, Chopper Squad and The Flying Doctors, and the miniseries The Lancaster Miller Affair; British shows such as Airline, Piece of Cake and Squadron, the Canadian series Arctic Air; JETS – Leben am Limit and Medicopter 117 – Jedes Leben zählt from Germany; and the Canadian–British–German co-production Ritter's Cove.

A-1 Skyraider
In the 1953 James A. Michener novel The Bridges at Toko-ri,  Douglas AD-1 Skyraiders fly RESCAP missions over a downed McDonnell F2H Banshee and Sikorsky HO3S-1 during the Korean War. In the 1954 film of the same name, the Banshee was replaced by a Grumman F9F Panther.

Two privately owned Skyraiders depicted U.S. Air Force "Sandy" search-and-rescue escort aircraft in the 1991 film Flight of the Intruder.

The Skyraider was among the many aircraft shown providing close air support during the First Battle of the Ia Drang Valley Campaign in Mel Gibson's 2002 film We Were Soldiers, based on the non-fiction book We Were Soldiers Once... And Young by retired Lieutenant General Hal Moore and reporter Joseph L. Galloway.

The Skyraider appeared in the 2006 Werner Herzog film Rescue Dawn, which was based on the true story of German-American Naval aviator Dieter Dengler. After his Skyraider was shot down in 1966 over Laos, Dengler endured months of captivity and torture before he escaped and was rescued.

The Skyraider is briefly shown in the 2022 Korean War drama film Devotion.

A-6 Intruder
The 1986 Stephen Coonts novel Flight of the Intruder is about two naval aviators who take their Grumman A-6 Intruder on an unauthorized bombing raid on Hanoi during the Vietnam War. It was made into a 1991 film of the same name.

A-10 Thunderbolt II

The A-10 Thunderbolt II is among the player-flyable aircraft in the 1989 video game U.N. Squadron. The aircraft is also featured in the 1989 video game A-10 Tank Killer. It has since appeared in the Ace Combat series and is a study-level aircraft in the combat flight simulator DCS world.

in the 2005 film Jarhead, A-10s attack U.S. Marine forces in a friendly fire incident.

In 2008, the Hasbro toy company released a minor Transformers character, Powerglide, that turned into an A-10.

In the 2009 film Terminator Salvation, several A-10s are sent to support the ground troops led by John Connor in the opening sequence of the film. Later, two Resistance A-10s are shot down when trying to intercept the machine transport in which Marcus Wright and Kyle Reese were captive.

In the 2013 film Man of Steel, three A-10s are sent to Smallville to kill Superman and General Zod and his henchmen, who destroy two of the jets.

A-26/B-26 Invader
Two A-26 firebombers were featured in the 1989 Steven Spielberg film Always. Attempts to use radio-controlled models for special effects shots were abandoned as unworkable; instead, models were "flown" from wire rigs.

A6M Zero
The Mitsubishi A6M Zero was featured in the films The Final Countdown, Pearl Harbor, and Tora! Tora! Tora!. The Zero was also depicted in the 1976 film Midway; however real Zeros were not used. Modified T-6 Texans were used in Tora! Tora! Tora!, Midway, and The Final Countdown to depict A6M2 Type 21 Zero fighters, and some footage from the former was reused in the latter. Three Type 52 Zeros were used in Pearl Harbor. Two restored aircraft operated by Flight Magic, and one in the Planes of Fame Air Museum collection were barged to Hawaii where "all three aircraft were extensively flown with few problems until NX6528L suffered a gear-up landing. Fortunately, this was near the end of filming. NX6528L was shipped to Pete Regina Aviation at Van Nuys, California where it was returned to flying condition. This aircraft is now with the Commemorative Air Force Southern California Wing at Camarillo Airport."

The A5M and A6M are both featured in The Wind Rises, a 2013 Studio Ghibli animated fictionalized biopic of Zero designer Jiro Horikoshi.

Zero fighters are shown in the 2013 Japanese novel Eien No Zero (The Eternal Zero) by Naoki Hyakuta, which was made into a 2013 film of the same name directed by Takashi Yamazaki.

Aérospatiale Gazelle
A heavily modified Aérospatiale Gazelle was the centerpiece of the 1983 John Badham action film Blue Thunder. The same helicopter appeared in the short-lived 1984 TV series by the same name starring James Farentino. The modified Gazelle went on to be used in the TV mini-series Amerika.

Aérospatiale Puma
Modified Aérospatiale SA 330 Pumas were used to depict Mil Mi-24 helicopter gunships in the films Red Dawn (1984), Rambo: First Blood Part II (1985), and Rambo III (1988).

AgustaWestland AW101
At the climax of the 2012 James Bond film Skyfall, an armed AgustaWestland AW101 Merlin transport helicopter is used in the main villain Silva's assault on Bond and M at Bond's childhood home.

AH-64 Apache
The Boeing AH-64 Apache had a major role in the 1990 action-thriller film directed by David Green, Fire Birds (or Wings of the Apache).

The 1992 shooter game Desert Strike has the main character flying the AH-64 to complete various missions.

Gunship is an AH-64 Apache helicopter simulation that was released by Microprose in 1986. The sequel Gunship 2000 was released in 1991. Since then, the helicopter has also made an appearance in the hardcore study-level sim DCS: World, being praised for its accurate depiction of the systems and procedures.

In the 2008 film The Incredible Hulk, an AH-64 was used in an attempt to kill the Hulk with the unusual configuration of twin, pylon-mounted miniguns.

In the 2009 film G.I. Joe: The Rise of Cobra, Apaches provide air cover for a convoy carrying nanotechnology-based weapons.

Airspeed Horsa
The assault on what would later be known as the Pegasus Bridge over the Caen Canal in France by British commandos landing in Airspeed Horsa gliders was depicted in the 1962 war epic The Longest Day. Only one Horsa replica was actually constructed.

Ten non-flyable Airspeed Horsa mockups were fabricated for the filming of the 1977 film A Bridge Too Far.

Albatros fighter (generic)
An Albatros fighter appears in the 1966 novel In the Company of Eagles by Ernest K Gann. The novel is set in 1916 during the First World War and features a German ace pilot Lt Sebastian Kupper of Jasta 76 who, flying an Albatros scout, pursues a burning French aircraft and, in what was intended as an act of mercy, kills the pilot so as to spare him from slowly burning to death. The gesture is misinterpreted as an act of murder by one of the French pilot's comrades, Sgt. Paul Chamay who vows to seek and kill the German pilot.

American Eagle A-1
At least two American Eagle A-1s were employed in the production of the 1930 film Young Eagles which was directed by William A. Wellman and starred Buddy Rogers and Jean Arthur. The film portrayed American pilots serving in France during the Great War. Although the A-1 was a post-WW1 trainer, the film-makers considered it suitable to portray wartime aircraft. One Eagle was painted with USAS insignia while a second was painted with German markings. Stunt pilot Dick Grace was hired to deliberately crash-land both of them in separate scenes, which severely damaged both aircraft. Grace escaped injury on both occasions.

Avro Anson

An Avro Anson was used as a "stand-in" to represent the Boeing 247 Race 57 flown in the 1934 England-to-Australia MacRobertson Air Race by Roscoe Turner, in the 1991 Australian television miniseries The Great Air Race. Turner was played by Barry Bostwick in the miniseries.

Avro Ashton
An Avro Ashton, in its six-engined, Olympus testbed form, appeared as the fictitious Phoenix airliner in Cone of Silence (1960), based on the novel of the same name by David Beaty, a former BOAC pilot. This concerned the takeoff problems of the Phoenix, and the subsequent accident investigation; it was based on two takeoff accidents to the de Havilland Comet.

Avro Canada CF-105 Arrow
The Avro Canada CF-105 Arrow makes a prominent appearance in Daniel Wyatt's 1990 novel, The Last Flight of the Arrow. In the novel, the real-life destruction of the fighter is a cover for a secret U.S.-Canadian continental air-defense initiative that fields a fleet of Arrows. A Polish-Canadian Royal Canadian Air Force pilot flies one Arrow on a high-speed reconnaissance flight over Russia to find proof that the Soviet Union is planning an airstrike on North America.

Avro Lancaster

The Avro Lancaster was the best-known Royal Air Force heavy bomber of World War II. As such it has appeared in many works of fiction related to Bomber Command and its night raids over Germany and occupied Europe.

Lancasters appeared in the 1952 British war film Appointment in London (released in the US as Raiders in the Sky) directed by Philip Leacock and starring Dirk Bogarde. Three Lancasters were used in the production—NX673, NX679 and NX782, the same three that were used in the filming of The Dam Busters three years later.

The Lancaster was central to the second half of the 1955 British film The Dam Busters. This is a dramatisation of the real-life Operation Chastise, which included the forming of No. 617 Squadron RAF commanded by Wing Commander Guy Gibson, who was awarded the Victoria Cross (VC), and the bombing of the Möhne, Eder and Sorpe Dams in Germany to interrupt water and hydro-electric power supplies to German munitions factories. The film is based on the The Dam Busters books by Paul Brickhill and Enemy Coast Ahead by Guy Gibson. A number of B VII Lancasters in storage were modified to the original configuration of the B III (Special) for use on screen.

The Lancaster also appeared in The Guns of Navarone (1961).

A 1989 British commercial for Carling Black Label lager reused Avro Lancaster footage in a Dam Busters parody sequence where a German soldier on top of a dam catches the Lancaster's bombs like a football goalkeeper. The pilot of the attacking Lancaster then delivers the brand slogan: "I bet he drinks Carling Black Label!" The commercial ran for many years, frequently appearing in commercial breaks during broadcasts of both The Dam Busters and documentaries about Operation Chastise.

Len Deighton's 1970 novel Bomber describes an attack by Royal Air Force Lancasters on Krefeld, Germany, during which a series of unplanned incidents leads to the carpet bombing of a small town nearby.

The Avro Lancaster was also featured in the UK television series Pathfinders, aired in 1972, concentrating on the lives of the aircrew of a fictional Pathfinder squadron during the Second World War.

Lancasters appear in the 2011 novel Dambuster by Robert Radcliffe.

The 2019 budget independent film Lancaster Skies (also titled Our Shining Sword) centres on a loner who takes over as leader of a Lancaster crew.

The Avro Lancaster was the preferred aircraft of the fictional war hero pilot Matt Braddock, who first appeared in the British story paper The Rover, and later in comic strips in British action comics The Victor and Warlord.

Avro Vulcan
Avro Vulcans are the central feature of the 2008 aviation novel by English author Derek Robinson, titled Hullo Russia, Goodbye England. A British RAF pilot named Silk, a veteran of Bomber Command in the Second World War, rejoins the service at the height of the Cold War.

The 1965 James Bond film Thunderball features the hijacking of an Avro Vulcan for its nuclear bombs.

B-1 Lancer
A B-1B Lancer was portrayed as the laser weapon's test bed in the closing scenes of the 1985 film Real Genius.

A B-1B drops bombs during the climactic battle scene in the 2009 film Transformers: Revenge of the Fallen.

B-2 Spirit
The Northrop Grumman B-2 Spirit is featured in the 1996 Independence Day film, where it fires a nuclear missile at an antagonist alien spaceship. In the movie Cloverfield, the aircraft bombs a monster that is destroying Manhattan. The bomber also appeared in the films Iron Man 2, Captain Marvel, and Rampage.

B-17 Flying Fortress

Boeing B-17 Flying Fortresses of the 132nd Bomb Squadron, 9th Bomb Group from March Field, California, ("Land of the Flying Fortress") were featured in the 1941 Paramount Pictures film I Wanted Wings, based on the novel of the same title by 1st Lt. Beirne Lay Jr.

In William Wyler's 1946 film The Best Years of Our Lives, B-17s are prominently featured. The primary male characters hitch a cross country ride in a B-17E Flying Fortress early in the story, and at the conclusion the scrapyard at Chino, California, is shown full of disposal B-17s and YB-40 gunship versions of the B-17.

B-17s also figured prominently in the Oscar-winning 1949 film Twelve O'Clock High starring Gregory Peck. The film concerns aviation leadership and the human toll in the USAAF strategy of daylight precision bombing. The US Air Force cooperated in the production of the film, lending aircraft to the producers and allowing filming at Eglin Air Force Base and at Ozark Army Air Field. The film featured an actual crash landing of a B-17, piloted by veteran stunt pilot Paul Mantz.

B-17s appear in the 1951 novel The Sun is Silent by Saul Levitt which traces the journey of a B-17 crew from their training through to daylight bombing missions over Germany. The author himself had served as a radioman/gunner in a B-17 during the war.

For the 1954 film The Glenn Miller Story, directed by Anthony Mann, a wartime performance set in a UK air base hangar was shot in Hangar No. 1 at Lowry Air Force Base, Colorado, on 10 July 1953, with the late-production B-17G command aircraft of Gen. John G. Sprague, commanding officer of Lowry, as a backdrop. It received a wartime coat of olive drab paint for the appearance, but the chin turret was removed. Anachronistic B-29 engine cowlings line the back wall of the hangar, although B-29s were not used in the ETO.

Five flyable B-17s were secured by producer Elmo Williams for use in the filming of the 1970 motion picture Tora! Tora! Tora!. During filming, one B-17 suffered a landing gear malfunction, forcing it to land on one wheel. Williams ordered a camera crew to film the landing and incorporated the footage into the film's script.

The B-17 Flying Fortress was the subject of the 1990 Warner Bros. film Memphis Belle. During filming, one of the five vintage B-17s was destroyed in an accidental crash and a second was damaged when an engine cowling detached in flight, tearing a chunk out of the aircraft's tail. There were no injuries in either incident.

B-17s are the main aircraft featured in two novels depicting fictional characters in the US daylight bombing offensive over Germany and Occupied Europe, American writer Sam Helpert's A Real Good War (1997) and UK author Robert Radcliffe's Under an English Heaven (2004).

For George Lucas' 2012 film Red Tails about the 332d Fighter Group, the Tuskegee Airmen, the B-17G "Pink Lady" operated by the Association Forteresse Toujours Volante, appeared as a 351st Bomb Group aircraft named "Yankee", coded ED-N. Filmed in the Czech Republic in 2010, the film company funding allowed the warbird to fly for an additional year before being retired to museum status. Other Flying Fortresses were rendered through CGI.

B-17s appear in the 2014 graphic novel mini-series Castles in the Sky, published by Avatar, written by Garth Ennis and illustrated by Matt Martin & Keith Burns. The story features a gunner named Leonard Wetmore who is one of the crew of the B-17 'Buffalo Gal' during the U.S. daylight bombing offensive against Germany. The story was one of Ennis' War Stories series.

B-18 Bolo
Douglas B-18 Bolos are prominently featured in the 1943 RKO picture Bombardier, filmed at Kirtland Field, New Mexico.

B-24 Liberator

A Consolidated B-24 Liberator was featured in the 1977 Telemovie Young Joe, the Forgotten Kennedy.

B-24s appear in the 1944 20th Century Fox film Winged Victory which was directed by George Cukor and which portrayed cadets undergoing training as aircrew in the U.S. Army Air Forces during WW2. The AAF detached several B-24s to the production, which was filmed at Santa Ana Army Airfield in California.

The novel Face of a Hero (1950) tells the story of a B-24 crew operating from an airport in Apulia, Italy, in 1944; it is based on the real experiences of its author, Louis Falstein, who had been a tail gunner on a USAAF B-24. The novel describes in detail the raids of the B-24 bombers on Romania, Yugoslavia, northern Italy, southern France, and Germany.

B-24s are a central feature in the 1952 novel Angle of Attack by Joseph Landon. The story concerns navigator Irwin 'Win' Hellman, whose B-24 is attacked by enemy fighters and badly damaged over Vienna. The B-24's pilot signals to the enemy fliers that he wishes to surrender but Hellman, who is Jewish and dreads being captured alive, believes they can still escape and, with the backing of the other crew, he takes command.

B-24s appear in the 1957 novel The Damned Wear Wings by David Camerer, a work that portrays B-24s of the 473rd Bomb Group based in Italy tasked with bombing the oil refineries at Ploesti, Romania.

The 1961 novel Goodbye to Some by Gordon Forbes portrays Lt Carl Iverson, a pilot of a B-24 of VPB-400 US Navy Air Wing, a unit that flies patrols from a base in the Sulu Sea during the Pacific War in WW2.

The story of the "Lady Be Good" inspired a 1970 television movie titled Sole Survivor, with a North American B-25 Mitchell playing the B-24D role.

In the young adult novel Under a War-Torn Sky, the main character Henry Forester co-pilots Out of the Blue, a US B-24 Liberator serving in the Royal Air Force.

B-24s appear in the 1979 novel The White Sea Bird by David Beaty, a story about an RAF bomber unit whose commander becomes obsessed with hunting a German surface raider lurking in a secret base in a Norwegian Fjord and menacing Allied convoys at sea.

B-24s are a major feature of the 1979 novel Rider on the Wind by David Westheimer. The novel portrays a B-24 pilot of the USAAF stationed in Palestine during the Second World War and who meets a Jewish resistance-fighter. The author himself served as a navigator in a B-24 with the 98th Bomb Group stationed in Palestine & Egypt in 1942.

B-25 Mitchell

The North American B-25 Mitchell had feature roles in the films Thirty Seconds over Tokyo (1944) (pilot Ted Lawson's account of the Doolittle Raid), Hanover Street (1979) based on a fictional B-25 unit stationed in England, and Forever Young (1992), following a B-25 test pilot's story both in the past and present.

A B-25 features in the 1965 World War II film In Harm's Way directed by Otto Preminger and starring John Wayne and Kirk Douglas.

The Sole Survivor, a 1970 telemovie, was also based loosely on the "Lady Be Good", and also featured a B-25 in the Liberator role. It first aired 9 January 1970.

The B-25 is featured in the 1970 Mike Nichols film Catch-22, which had 17 film unit B-25s in flying condition. Like the Battle of Britains resurrection and ultimate preservation of German and British aviation combatants, the Catch-22 air force helped form a nucleus of the nascent warbirds movement. Fifteen of the 18 bombers used in the film still remain intact, including one on display at the Smithsonian Institution's National Air and Space Museum.

B-25s appear in the 1976 novel Whip by Martin Caidin, which portrays a B-25 unit based in Australia and commanded by Captain 'Whip' Russell and they are employed in low-level bombing missions against Japanese convoys carrying reinforcements to Guadalcanal and Rabaul in 1942.

The B-25 was the focus of the second half of the 2001 film Pearl Harbor, although critics complained that the bomber and its role were being depicted inaccurately.

The bulk of the action in Craig Johnson's 2013 novel Spirit of Steamboat takes place on an old Mitchell VB-25J nicknamed "Steamboat", as it is flown through a snowstorm on a rescue mission over the Great Plains.

A B-25 is used in the 2011 film Sucker Punch.

B-25s appear in the 2019 Hulu mini-series Catch-22 directed by George Clooney. Two vintage B-25s were used in the production and other B-25s were re-created with CGI.

B-29 Superfortress
The Boeing B-29 Superfortress has played an important role in several Hollywood films, particularly the Enola Gay, which dropped the first atomic bomb. The Enola Gay was depicted in Above and Beyond and The Beginning or the End.

The first Hollywood retelling of the 509th Composite Group's preparation for the atomic missions was Above and Beyond, released by MGM in 1953, with Robert Taylor portraying Col. Paul Tibbetts, and Jim Backus as Gen. Curtis LeMay. Filmed at Davis-Monthan Air Force Base.

The B-29 also played the titular role in the 1980 Disney film The Last Flight of Noah's Ark.

Film makers also used the only flight-worthy B-29 ("FIFI") in 1983 in the film The Right Stuff to recreate the launch of the Bell X-1 for the first supersonic flight.

B-36 Peacemaker
The Convair B-36 featured prominently in Paramount's 1955 film Strategic Air Command starring James Stewart, who plays a World War II bomber pilot and member of the Air Force Reserve and is forced to crash land in the Arctic. The film features many good aerial shots of B-36s and was primarily filmed at Carswell AFB, Texas, and MacDill AFB in Tampa, Florida, and Al Lang Field in nearby St. Petersburg, Florida. One particularly difficult shot was that of Stewart's character, a baseball player, standing on the baseball field at Al Lang Field while a B-36 flies overhead and casts a shadow over him, foreshadowing his imminent recall to active service.

B-47 Stratojet

The Boeing B-47 Stratojet gets a secondary role in Paramount's 1955 film Strategic Air Command (SAC), starring James Stewart, as the new jet that is nothing like the old Convair B-36 he is used to. The film features good aerial footage of both the B-47 and the B-36. The majority of B-47 scenes were filmed at MacDill Air Force Base, Florida, using aircraft from the 306th Bombardment Wing.

Ejection seat testing of B-47s performed at Eglin AFB, Florida, in 1953 and 1954 as part of aeromedical research was recreated in the 1955 20th Century Fox film On the Threshold of Space starring Guy Madison, and in a 1957 Pine-Thomas Productions drama Bailout at 43,000.

The 1957 Warner Brothers melodrama film Bombers B-52 features Castle Air Force Base, proudly sporting its slogan "Home of the B-47", and its transition from the Stratojet to the new B-52.

B-52 Stratofortress

The 1963 film A Gathering of Eagles focuses on the stresses of a B-52 wing commander at the height of the Cold War. Some excellent visuals of the B-52 including a complex inflight refueling operation which nearly ends in disaster.

The B-52 was also a key part of Stanley Kubrick's 1964 black comedy film Dr. Strangelove or: How I Learned to Stop Worrying and Love the Bomb.

A B-52 was a focal point of the 1983 novel Trinity's Child, by William Prochnau, and the 1990 telemovie adaptation, By Dawn's Early Light.

Bell 47
The 1950s syndicated American television series Whirlybirds, produced by Desilu Studios, starred a pair of Bell 47 helicopters. The association with Whirlybirds continues to be used to promote helicopters and the Bell 47 in particular. A Bell 47 was also one of the 'stars' of the Australian television series Skippy the Bush Kangaroo.

In the opening scenes of Federico Fellini's 1960 comedy-drama film La Dolce Vita a Bell 47 transports a statue of Christ across the city of Rome. A second Bell 47 in pursuit contains the reporter Marcello Rubini (Marcello Mastroianni) and his sidekick Papparazo.

A Bell 47J equipped with floats was used in the 1965 James Bond film Thunderball. The helicopter lands on the water as Bond searches for an Avro Vulcan bomber that has gone missing.

A Bell 47G3B-1 was used as the "Batcopter" in the 1966 Batman film. This airframe had previously appeared in Lassie Come Home.

A Bell 47 depicted a supposed German helicopter in the 1968 action film Where Eagles Dare. Although experimental German helicopter types did exist in this time period, the Focke-Achgelis Fa 223 was a larger, twin-rotor machine, which was used on only a limited basis.

The Bell 47, in its military configuration as a H-13 Sioux regularly appeared in the M*A*S*H film (1970) and television series (1972-1983).

In the 1979 Norman Jewison film ...And Justice For All, the main characters go for a ride in a Bell 47G-2 that ends up ditching in Baltimore's Inner Harbor when it runs out of fuel.

Bell 206
Chopper Squad was a 1970s Australian television series about a Bell 206 JetRanger used for rescue work in Sydney. The helicopter used was an actual rescue helicopter operated by the Westpac Life Saver Rescue Helicopter Service.

A Bell 206B was one of the helicopters that attacks the oil rig control center of Ernst Stavro Blofeld in the climactic scenes of the 1971 James Bond film Diamonds Are Forever. The Jet Ranger also appeared in the 1977 Bond film The Spy Who Loved Me

In the 1983 film Blue Thunder, a Jet Ranger is portrayed as a LAPD helicopter flying for the Astro division. Also appears in the 1991 film Terminator 2: Judgment Day, as another LAPD helicopter, which is stolen by the T-1000 Terminator and flown under an expressway to pursue John Connor, Sarah Connor and the T-800 Terminator protecting them.

Bell 222
A Bell 222A was featured in the telemovie Airwolf, which starred Jan-Michael Vincent and Ernest Borgnine. Within the year, the film was made into a TV series which aired from 1984 to 1986.

In the 1991 film Harley Davidson and the Marlboro Man, a Bell 222UT is used to eliminate the antagonists in a high rise building near downtown Los Angeles.

Bell AH-1 Cobra
In the 1990 film Fire Birds, a Bell AH-1 Cobra of the United States Army emerges in the opening sequence, when it is ambushed by a drug runner's Scorpion helicopter portrayed by a McDonnell Douglas MD 500 Defender.

A pair of AH-1s appear in Simon West's 1997 film Con Air. The helicopters are used in an attempt to bring down a hijacked Justice Prisoner and Alien Transportation System (JPATS) aircraft.

In J. J. Abrams 2006 film Mission: Impossible III, the Impossible Missions Force (IMF) team use a Bell 204 to escape after rescuing one of their team members. They must evade an AH-1 Cobra, which pursues them through a wind farm, firing heat seeking rockets at them.

Bell UH-1 Iroquois

The Bell UH-1 Iroquois (commonly called the Huey) was the most common helicopter during the Vietnam War, as an aircraft used to insert and remove troops from the field, transport casualties for medical treatment and as a gunship. As such, it has appeared in many works of fiction related to the war.

The UH-1 was an important part of the 1968 film The Green Berets. The production company paid $18,623.64 for the material, the eighty-five hours of flying time by UH-1 helicopters, and thirty-eight hundred man-days for military personnel taken away from their regular duties.

Two UH-1H Hueys make up part of the attack package on Ernst Stavro Blofeld's oil rig command center at the climax of the 1971 James Bond film Diamonds Are Forever.

The UH-1 was in Francis Ford Coppola's 1979 film Apocalypse Now. Several Hueys were rented from the Philippine Air Force. The distinct and iconic sound of the helicopters was featured prominently in the film's sound design of the soundtrack.

UH-1s were prominently featured in Oliver Stone's 1986 film Platoon.

The 1990 film Air America, about the CIA's proprietary airline during the war in Southeast Asia, featured the ubiquitous Huey helicopter.

A Bell 205 is used as a mountain rescue helicopter in the 1993 film Cliffhanger. The aircraft is used to locate a missing jet and then employed to find stolen money. Towards the film's end the helicopter is dangling upside down against a cliff, where the hero (Sylvester Stallone) and villain (John Lithgow) brawl on the belly of the aircraft.

The UH-1 is a central part of the 2002 Vietnam war film We Were Soldiers. The helicopter is shown ferrying troops into the Ia Drang valley as part of the then-new concept of air cavalry. The film particularly focused on the flights of Major Bruce Crandall, who was later awarded the Medal of Honor for his actions while piloting his UH-1 during the battle depicted in the film. Four of the UH-1s used were provided by the Georgia Army National Guard.

The slaying of Israeli athletes by Black September terrorists and the destruction of a Bundesgrenzschutz Bell/Dornier UH-1D during the 1972 Summer Olympics was depicted in the 2005 Steven Spielberg film Munich.

UH-1 helicopters are seen as the primary transport aircraft in the 2017 film Kong: Skull Island, and are attacked by Kong after launching seismic bombs in an attempt to map the Island's caves.

Bell X-1

The Bell X-1 was depicted early in the film The Right Stuff. The film showed the historic flight of the X-1 becoming the first aircraft to break the sound barrier in level flight under its own propulsion. This achievement helped usher in the US space program that was the subject of the rest of the film. A mock-up built for the film is now displayed at the Planes of Fame Museum, Chino, California.

Bell X-2
A Bell X-2 mock-up was built for the pilot-film of the TV series Quantum Leap. It is now on display at the Planes of Fame Museum, Chino, California.

Boeing 247
The 1936 movie Without Orders centers on the emergency landing of a Boeing 247 by the stewardess.

The 1936 movie 13 Hours by Air takes place largely aboard a transcontinental Boeing 247 flight and includes significant historically interesting second-unit footage of actual terminal facilities on United Air Lines's then-new transcontinental route network.

Boeing 707
The 1961 episode "The Odyssey of Flight 33" of television series The Twilight Zone takes place on a Boeing 707 with the aircraft traveling through various periods of history.

A Boeing 707-349C leased from Flying Tiger Line portrayed two aircraft in the 1970 film Airport, based on the 1968 Arthur Hailey novel of the same name.

The Boeing 707 is featured as the titular aircraft in Airplane!, a 1980 disaster-parody film by Jon Davison.

In 2011, the American television series Pan Am took place in the early and mid-1960s and featured interior sets and exterior CGI representations of the 707 on the ground and in flight; it was Pan Am's flagship airliner during that time. Additional footage of John Travolta's Boeing 707 in Pan Am livery has also been used in the TV series.

In Alistair Maclean's Air Force One Is Down (1983), a master criminal plans to steal Air Force One (then a 707) humiliate POTUS Warren G. Wheeler, and blows up a cargo-carrier 707 painted like it to effect the plan.

Columbo arrives at Heathrow Airport from LA aboard a 707 in Dagger of the Mind (S2E4).

Boeing 727
Industrial Light and Magic constructed a large-scale model of a Boeing 727 of fibreglass and aluminum for use in the 1990 action film Die Hard 2.

The 1996 film Eraser includes an elaborate action sequence involving a parachute jump from a crippled Boeing 727.

The 1998 film U.S. Marshals depicts the crash of a 727 from the Justice Prisoner and Alien Transportation System (JPATS).

Boeing 737
In the 2008 TV series Breaking Bad, the mid-air crash between two Boeing 737 over Albuquerque, referred as the Wayfarer 515 disaster, takes an important part in the plot. Because of it, this model is featured and mentioned several times during the second season. Also, the episode "Seven Thirty-Seven" is named for the aircraft; it is the first of several episode titles that collectively foreshadow the Wayfarer 515 disaster. When placed together, they read "Seven Thirty-Seven Down Over ABQ".

Boeing 747

A redressed Boeing 747 of American Airlines was featured extensively in the 1974 film Airport 1975, and the sequel Airport 77.

The 1983 TBS drama series  (Stewardess Monogatari - A Stewardess’ Tale) focuses on 19 year old Chiaki Matsumoto (played by Chiemi Hori) and her path to become a Japan Airlines flight attendant. The series was filmed in cooperation with JAL, which allowed filming at their actual base at Narita International Airport. Many shots are filmed of 747 revenue flights at Narita, and a few episodes were produced inside the maintenance hangar as Chiaki and her classmates perform various training classes and exercises to learn about the aircraft. JA8161 was used extensively throughout production and JA8110 is featured in the opening credits.

In the 1990 action film Die Hard 2, a 747 that has been hijacked by terrorists is destroyed by John McClane. Three 23-foot models were fabricated by Industrial Light and Magic with one destroyed during filming done at a remote airstrip in the Mojave Desert of California. The effects were matched to a real 747 filmed taxiing at Alpena, Michigan. The cost of the special effects pushed the film's production costs towards the then-record of $70 million.

A 747-212B, rented from Kalitta Air, was the title subject of the 1997 film Air Force One, portraying the real 747-200-based VC-25 that transports the US president.

The 747 was also prominent in the novel and the 2002 film The Sum of All Fears as the National Airborne Operations Center during a nuclear showdown with Russia.

A 747 in-flight is also the setting for the 2006 horror-thriller film Snakes on a Plane in which a large number of venomous snakes wriggle loose on the large jet.

An All Nippon Airways Boeing 747-400 was featured in the 2008 Japanese movie Happy Flight.

Boeing 757

A Boeing 757 is the setting of the 2006 film United 93, that is based on the events on board United Airlines Flight 93 which was hijacked during the September 11 attacks in 2001.

Boeing 767
An Air New Zealand Boeing 767-200 was featured in the 1993 TV movie Mercy Mission: the Rescue of Flight 771, whereby its crew lead a lost Cessna 188 to a safe landing place. The movie is based on the Cessna 188 Pacific rescue that took place in 1978. The plane in the actual rescue was a McDonnell Douglas DC-10-30 and the Boeing 767 was not introduced into Air New Zealand's fleet until 1985.

The Boeing 767 is the setting of the 2014 action film Non-Stop in which a killer onboard is executing the aircraft's passengers and crew.

Boeing 777
A modified Boeing 777 was used as the United States Air Force mothership for an experimental NASA spaceplane in the 2006 film Superman Returns.

Boeing-Stearman Model 75
In 1950, Paul Mantz tore the wings off a Boeing PT-13D (Model 75) Stearman by flying between two oaks for the 1950 film When Willie Comes Marching Home. A crop-dusting Stearman, N6340, was featured early in the 1963 Elvis Presley film It Happened at the World's Fair.

A Boeing Stearman appears in the climactic scene of the Disney Sci-Fi film The Cat from Outer Space (1978). The scene involves a mid-air transfer of characters between the Stearman and a Gazelle helicopter. The Stearman is a wreck but is flown by the powers of the magic necklace belonging to the cat Jake.

More recently, Model 75s have appeared in a number of films including Independence Day (1996), The English Patient (1997), and Pearl Harbor (2001).

Bristol Beaufighter

Comics writer Garth Ennis' 2007 revival of the old British war comic hero Battler Britton: Bloody Good Show, featured the ace fighter pilot commanding a squadron of Bristol Beaufighters in North Africa during the Second World War.

Bristol Blenheim 
Bristol Blenheims appear in the 1945 British film The Way to the Stars (released in the US as Johnny in the Clouds). In the early part of the film, Pilot Officer Peter Penrose (John Mills), a '15-hour sprog' (rookie) arrives at Halfpenny Field, a Royal Air-Force aerodrome, in the summer of 1940 and joins B-Flight of No 72 Squadron, equipped with Blenheims and commanded by Flight-Lieutenant David Archdale (Michael Redgrave).

A Bristol Blenheim IV, restored from a Bolingbroke IVT, appeared in the 1995 film Richard III, an adaptation of Shakespeare's play directed by and starring Ian McKellen; who set the play in an imaginary 1930s England ruled by a fascist-style Monarch.

Bristol Britannia
A Bristol Type 175 Britannia airliner was the central feature of the 1959 film Jet Over the Atlantic (also released as High Over the Atlantic), a drama directed by Byron Haskin and starring Guy Madison and Virginia Mayo. The film's plot is about an airliner en route from Spain to the United States. Among the passengers is an American who has been arrested for murder and is being extradited back to the US. Another passenger, rendered mentally unstable by the loss of his daughter, releases a toxic gas on board the aircraft, rendering the flight crew unconscious, leaving the prisoner as the only person capable of flying the aircraft. Despite the film's title, the Bristol Type 175 was a turbo-prop engined aircraft rather than a jet-powered plane.

Bristol F2B
In the long-running British First World War comic strip Charley's War, published in Battle Picture Weekly 1979–1986 and written by Pat Mills and illustrated by Joe Colquhoun, the storyline goes on a tangent when Charley Bourne's younger brother Wilf enlists under-age and becomes an observer/gunner in a Bristol F2B squadron in France in early 1918.

A replica Bristol F2B mounted on skis was featured in the 1981 film Death Hunt which starred Charles Bronson and Lee Marvin. The replica, which was constructed in the US and had an inverted Ford Ranger engine instead of a Rolls-Royce, was originally commissioned in 1979 to appear in the film High Road to China (1983), but was not used in that production.

The fictional RFC unit featured in Derek Robinson's 1999 novel Hornet's Sting, set in 1917 over the Western Front, exchange their outdated Sopwith Pups for the new Bristol F2Bs.

Bristol Tourer
A flying replica of a Bristol Tourer, a civil utility biplane developed from the Bristol F2B, appeared in the 1985 Australian TV mini-series A Thousand Skies, a dramatisation of the career of famous Australian aviator Charles Kingsford Smith.

Bristol Type 170 Freighter
A Bristol Type 170 Freighter Mk. 11A played a major role in the 1957 British film The Man in the Sky (distributed in the U.S. as Decision Against Time) directed by Charles Crichton and starring Jack Hawkins. In the film, one of the engines catches fire during a test flight, and Hawkins' character struggles to use up enough fuel to make an emergency landing. During filming, the aircraft was damaged in a crash, but was repaired and  returned to service with Silver City Airways until it was retired and scrapped in 1962.

Britten-Norman BN-2 Islander 
In the 2015 James Bond film Spectre, Bond pilots a BN-2 Islander through the Austrian Alps to rescue Madeleine Swann from Spectre gang members.

Bücker Bü 181
In the 1963 epic film The Great Escape, the prisoners of war played by James Garner and Donald Pleasence steal a Luftwaffe Bücker Bü 181. No aircraft were involved in the actual escape from Stalag Luft III. Pleasence, who had been an aircraft wireless operator with No. 166 Squadron, was imprisoned in Stalag Luft I after his Lancaster was shot down over Germany on 31 August 1944.

C-2 Greyhound
In the 2003 film Tears of the Sun, a SEAL team performs a parachute jump from a Grumman C-2A Greyhound to begin a mission in Nigeria.

C-17 Globemaster III

In the 2018 film Mission: Impossible – Fallout, Ethan Hunt performs a HALO jump from a Boeing C-17 Globemaster III belonging to the UAE Air Force.

In the TV series Agents of S.H.I.E.L.D., a heavily modified C-17 serves as the team's "Bus".

C-47 Skytrain / C-53 Skytrooper / Dakota
See also Douglas DC-3 section for the civilian aircraft on which the Dakota was based

A ski-equipped Douglas C-47 Skytrain is featured in Howard Hawks' 1951 science-fiction thriller, The Thing From Another World, based on the 1938 novella Who Goes There? by John W. Campbell, Jr.

In the 1955 British film The Night My Number Came Up directed by Leslie Norman and starring Michael Redgrave and Denholm Elliott, a man tells guests at a dinner party of a dream he had of a Tokyo-bound Dakota that crashes in the Japanese mountains. Some of the guests board such a flight the next day and they begin to fear the dream is coming true.

Eleven aircraft were gathered for airdrop scenes in the 1977 film A Bridge Too Far, all of which had to be of a paratroop configuration, representing the C-53 Skytrooper variant.

A Douglas C-47 DL Skytrain featured in the climactic scenes of the 1982 film The Wild Geese which starred Richard Burton and Roger Moore as the leaders of a group of British mercenaries sent to rescue a deposed African leader. The C-47 used in the film belonged to United Air of South Africa and was nick-named 'The Wild Goose' after its film role. The aircraft was destroyed in a crash in South Africa in 1988 which claimed the lives of all 24 people on board.

C-54 Skymaster
The 20th Century Fox production The Big Lift (originally titled Quartered City), set during the Berlin Airlift, was filmed in Berlin at a former German studio near Tempelhof in 1949 and Douglas C-54 Skymasters were prominently featured. Military personnel from Rhein-Main Air Base appeared as extras.

C-82 Packet
The crash of a Fairchild C-82 Packet in the North African desert is central to the plot of the 1965 film The Flight of the Phoenix drawn from a 1964 novel by Elleston Trevor of the same title.

C-119 Flying Boxcar

The Fairchild C-119 Flying Boxcar was the subject of the 2004 remake of Flight of the Phoenix, using the descendant design of the C-82 Packet of the original.

C-121 Constellation
Lockheed C-121A Constellation tail number 48-615 was used in the 1977 film MacArthur, starring Gregory Peck, painted in Supreme Commander for the Allied Powers (SCAP) markings.

C-123 Provider

In the 1990 action film Die Hard 2, John McClane ejects from the cockpit of a grounded Fairchild C-123 Provider for a parachute recovery just before terrorists destroy it. A full-scale fuselage mock-up, molded from a real Provider, was rigged with 3,000 bullet hits, each one drilled and loaded with a charge, tapped, and wired to discharge in sequence. Actual pyrotechnics work was done at Indian Dunes, California, with actor Bruce Willis' ejection composited into the shot later.

The 1990 film Air America loosely recounted the exploits of the Central Intelligence Agency proprietary airline in Southeast Asia in the 1960s and early 1970s and featured Fairchild C-123K Providers leased from the Royal Thai Air Force.

The C-123 was featured in the 1997 film Con Air, with much of the film's action taking place in and around the aircraft. Three C-123s were used in the production of the film. One aircraft was used for all of the flying sequences. Another was used for the taxiing scenes and the third Provider, non-airworthy and in poor condition, was dismantled and its fuselage used for the filming of the climatic crash scene.

C-130 Hercules

The 1976 film Raid on Entebbe was based on a real-life Israeli military rescue mission which relied on the unique short-field capabilities of the Lockheed C-130.

In the place of a Soviet transport plane, a C-130 Hercules (or Lockheed L-100 Hercules civilian model in military markings) was featured in the 1987 James Bond film The Living Daylights; a C-123K Provider was used for some tail ramp fight scene close-ups.

The special operations variant, the Lockheed MC-130 Combat Talon, was featured as the rescue aircraft in the 1997 film Air Force One, performing a daring mid-air rescue of the President and his family as Air Force One is failing and going into the water.

In the 2007 film Transformers a close air support variant of the C-130, the AC-130 gunship, is used to drive off the Decepticons after the military base in Qatar is attacked, by executing a pylon turn to deliver ground fire.

In the 2007 game Call of Duty 4: Modern Warfare, the player uses an AC-130H for support. The AC-130H is also playable during the mission "Death from Above".

In the 2013 film Olympus Has Fallen, a C-130 armed with multi-barrel cannons attacks Washington, D.C. and shoots down two USAF F-22 Raptor fighters sent to intercept it. The C-130 is shot down by another F-22 and crashes into the Washington Monument, causing part of it to collapse.

In the 2013 film Lone Survivor, an AC-130 variant provides firepower as Luttrell is extracted from the village towards the end of the film.

The 2020 film Operation Christmas Drop, a romantic comedy loosely based on the actual annual USAF humanitarian mission of the same name, features Alexander Ludwig as a C-130 pilot as he prepares and conducts the long-running mission in his C-130J.

CAC Wirraway
A restored Commonwealth Aircraft Corporation Wirraway, an Australian production variant of the North American NA-16 Harvard, appeared in the beach landing scenes in the 1998 war film The Thin Red Line directed by Terrence Malick and based on the 1962 James Jones novel of the same name. In the film, the aircraft is painted to depict a Douglas SBD Dauntless dive-bomber.

Capelis XC-12
The Capelis XC-12, an unsuccessful 1933 transport design, appears in the 1939 film Five Came Back, as a bomber in the 1942 Republic film Flying Tigers and the 1943 film Immortal Sergeant.

Caproni Ca.60
The Caproni Ca.60 Noviplano, a nine-wing flying boat of which only a single prototype was constructed and which crashed on its first test flight in 1921, features in the 2013 Japanese animated feature The Wind Rises, a romantic dramatization of the life of Japanese aircraft designer Jiro Horikoshi. In the film, the Italian aeronautical designer Giovanni Caproni appears as a mentor to Horikoshi in several dream sequences, one of which features a tour of the Ca.60.

CASA 2.111
Several ex-Spanish Air Force CASA 2.111s were used as "stand-ins" to depict German Heinkel He 111 bombers in the 1969 film Battle of Britain.

Four ex-Spanish CASA 2.111s, playing the role of Luftwaffe Heinkel He 111s, were also used in the production of the 1970 Oscar-winning film Patton, starring George C. Scott.

Caudron 277
A Caudron 277 was used to play the role of both British and German two-seaters in the 1966 First World War aerial epic The Blue Max directed by John Guillermin and based on the 1964 novel of the same name by Jack D. Hunter.

Cessna 310
The protagonist of the 1950s American television show Sky King, played by actor Kirby Grant, flew a Cessna 310 in later episodes.

Cessna 402
A Cessna 402, operated by the fictional small airline Sandpiper Air at Tom Nevers Field airport, Nantucket, was featured in the NBC-TV sitcom Wings which ran for eight seasons, 1990–1997.

Cessna T-50
The protagonist of the 1950s television show Sky King flew a Cessna T-50 in early episodes; the aircraft was later replaced by a Cessna 310.

CG-4 Haig / Hadrian
Crashed WACO CG-4A gliders of the 99th Troop Carrier Squadron were depicted by replicas in the film Saving Private Ryan. These were recreated using measurements taken from a surviving example at the Museum of Army Flying, Middle Wallop, Hampshire, England.

CH-34 Choctaw / Westland Wessex
A surplus US Army Sikorsky S-58DT (a converted UH-34D) was prominently featured as Screaming Mimi in the 1984–86 television series Riptide, and remains in service.

Westland Wessex helicopters portrayed CH-34 Choctaws in Stanley Kubrick's 1987 film Full Metal Jacket.

Turbine-repowered Sikorsky S-58Ts portrayed CH-34 Choctaws in the 1990 film Air America about the exploits of the Central Intelligence Agency proprietary airline during the war in Southeast Asia.

CH-46 Sea Knight / Boeing-Vertol 107
In the 1967 James Bond film You Only Live Twice a KV-107 has an electromagnet slung loaded underneath, and is used to airlift an antagonist's car off the road, thereby freeing up 007 from their pursuit.

Filming was done aboard the  museum ship.

CH-47 Chinook / Boeing-Vertol 234
In the 2000 film Rules of Engagement two Boeing-Vertol 234 Chinook helicopters are portrayed as Boeing Vertol CH-46 Sea Knights of the United States Marine Corps. The helicopters transport a rescue team to evacuate personal from a fallen embassy in Yemen.

A CH-47D performs the rescue mission by pulling up a wrecked Super Puma in the film Rescue Under Fire.

Cirrus SR22
Starting in 2007, the Cirrus SR22 became one of two aircraft (along with the F-16 Fighting Falcon) to be featured in Google Earth Flight Simulator.

The SR22 was also featured in the final scene of the 2010 romantic comedy film She's Out of My League.

Concorde

The Concorde was the title aircraft and star of the 1979 film The Concorde ... Airport '79 in which it was flown primarily by Alain Delon and George Kennedy's characters. The aircraft used crashed twenty one years later as Air France Flight 4590, killing all 109 people on board and four on the ground.

In the 1982 episode "Time-Flight" of the BBC sci fi series Doctor Who a Concorde, its passengers, and crew are pulled through time to a prehistoric version of Earth.

The Aerialbot Silverbolt of the Transformers turns into a Concorde.

In the 2010 Charles Stross novel The Fuller Memorandum, the occult arm of the British government maintains four Concordes for use as supersonic reconnaissance aircraft to monitor the Sleeper in the Pyramid. In the event of the Black Pharaoh awakening, the Concordes are to be used as nuclear bombers to attempt to contain the threat before it manifests on Earth.

In the 2017 film The Wife, two significant scenes, including the final one in the movie, take place on Concorde flights transporting a Nobel Prize winner. They were shot in the aircraft displayed at Scotland's National Museum of Flight.

Consolidated NY
United States Navy Consolidated NY trainers from Floyd Bennett Field appeared as some of the biplanes that attack King Kong atop the Empire State Building in the 1933 original film.

Convair XF-92
The Convair XF-92, an experimental delta-wing interceptor, played the role of an F-102 Delta Dagger in the 1956 film Toward the Unknown starring William Holden.

Curtiss JN-4 Jenny
A pair of Curtiss JN-4 Jenny biplanes featured in the 1919 silent film The Grim Game which starred Harry Houdini. In the film, the script originally called for a mid-air transfer of one of the characters between the two Jennys but while filming the scene, the two aircraft collided. Both pilots managed to safely crash-land and there were no injuries. The producers subsequently altered the script and incorporated the footage into the final cut.

A Curtiss JN-4 featured in the 1921 silent film Stranger than Fiction which starred Katherine MacDonald. The Jenny features in a major sequence in which the aircraft takes off from the roof of a 10-storey building in downtown Los Angeles. To film the scene, stunt pilot Frank Clarke took off from a wooden ramp. Prior to launching, the Jenny was fixed to an anchor with a rope which was cut after Clarke revved the engine to full power. Nonetheless, the Jenny dropped five storeys before Clarke was able to level out and fly along the length of Broadway street. It is not known if the producers asked permission from city officials prior to performing the stunt.

A pair of JN-4s also featured in the 1925 film The Cloud Rider. In one major scene, one of the Jennys flown by the film's female lead (played by Virginia Lee Corbin) loses a wheel (her plane having been sabotaged by the film's villains) and has to be assisted mid-air by the male lead (played by Al Wilson) who has another JN-4 pilot fly him alongside so he can climb onto the former's wing to render assistance. To film the scene, pilot Frank Clarke wore a wig to resemble the actress and after the aerial shots were completed, he was required to safely land his JN-4 with only one wheel.

A JN-4 appeared in the 1926 film The Woman with Four Faces directed by Herbert Brenon. Once again, Frank Clarke was employed as a stunt pilot. For one scene, he was required to double as the male lead and, while landing his aircraft, wave at actress Betty Compson. However, when Clarke took his eyes off the runway, his Jenny crashed into a tree but the pilot escaped without injury.

Curtiss RC-1
The rare US Marine Corps Curtiss RC-1 air ambulance, made an appearance in the 1935 Warner Bros. film Devil Dogs of the Air starring James Cagney and Pat O'Brien.

Dassault Mirage 2000
The Dassault Mirage 2000 is prominently featured in the 2005 French movie Sky Fighters (Les Chevaliers du ciel) about two air force pilots preventing a terrorist attack on the Bastille Day celebrations in Paris.

de Havilland Canada DHC-2 Beaver 

The 1982 film Mother Lode made use of a de Havilland Canada DHC-2 Beaver on floats as the neglected mount of character Jean Dupré (Nick Mancuso), who embarks on a search for a missing friend in northern British Columbia. During the filming the aircraft actually crashed while landing on a lake and sank. This accident was not in the original script, but the footage was retained and incorporated into the film's plot. The aircraft was recovered from the lake, repaired, restored and exported to the US.

The DHC-2 was central to the 1998 film Six Days Seven Nights. The actual flying in the film was done by its star, Harrison Ford, who enjoyed flying the Beaver so much that he bought one after filming was completed. Three flying Beavers and four non-flyable were used in the production, all detailed to exactly match one another.

de Havilland Comet
The de Havilland Comet airliner is featured in the 1952 British film The Sound Barrier. A Comet also appeared in the 1977 British film Are You Being Served?.

de Havilland DH.4
The 1927 William Wellman film Wings featured de Havilland DH.4s among many types depicting World War I aircraft.

de Havilland DH.9/DH.9A
A de Havilland DH.9 featured in the 1928 film The Legion of the Condemned which was directed by William A. Wellman and starred Gary Cooper. The film portrayed an RFC pilot named Gale Price (Cooper) who, heartbroken over what he believes to be his unrequited love for a French woman, volunteers for a special unit tasked with flying dangerous missions during the Great War. However, during a mission behind German lines, Price discovers the woman Christine is working as an Allied spy and is still in love with him. In the film, Price lands a DH.9 in enemy territory to rescue Christine from her German captors. The film also made extensive use of leftover aerial footage from Wings which Wellman had directed the previous year.

de Havilland DH.88 Comet
Grosvenor House and Black Magic, together with their crews, feature prominently in a 1990 TV two-part Australian dramatisation of the 1934 London to Melbourne MacRobertson Trophy Air Race, titled Half a World Away and later released on DVD as The Great Air Race. Non-flying replicas were constructed, that of G-ACSS being taxi-able.

A DH.88 Comet named Bulldog and voiced by John Cleese is one of the characters in Disney's 2013 animated film Planes.

de Havilland DH.89 Dragon Rapide
The de Havilland Dragon Rapide VH-BGP portrayed Rapide, ZK-ACO, "Tainui", race number 60, in the 1991 Australian mini-series The Great Air Race, about the 1934 London to Melbourne MacRobertson Trophy Air Race. It is also known as Half a World Away.

A de Havilland DH-89A Dragon Rapide 6 featured in the episode "Out of Time" in Season 1 (2006) of the BBC sci-fi series Torchwood. The episode features a DH-89 carrying three occupants, landing at Cardiff airport in the present day after being mysteriously transported in time from 1953.

de Havilland Fox Moth

The 1951 novel Round the Bend by Nevil Shute is the story of two men, both British Licensed Aircraft Engineers. A large number of different aircraft types, both fictitious and real, appear in the book. The narrator and one of the protagonists of the story is Tom Cutter, and the novel details his efforts to establish an air charter business in Bahrain immediately after World War II. His first aircraft is a de Havilland Fox Moth; it is later joined by several other aircraft as the business expands, mostly fictitious, but among them a Percival Proctor.

de Havilland Hornet Moth
The novel Hornet Flight by Ken Follett is a thriller of the Resistance against the Nazi occupation of Denmark in World War II. In the novel a de Havilland Hornet Moth is used by the protagonists to fly from Denmark to the United Kingdom with information about a German radar system. The author drew inspiration from an actual flight that took place during World War II.

de Havilland Mosquito
In the 1954 British film The Purple Plain with Gregory Peck, a Canadian Second World War pilot crashes a de Havilland Mosquito on the Burma plain and struggles to survive. Two flying Mosquito PR.34s from No. 81 Squadron RAF, Seletar, Singapore, and a "disused" T.3, which arrived in pieces at the film site at Negombo, Ceylon to represent the wrecked aircraft, were used in filming, all with fictional serial numbers. Flt. Sgt. (later Squadron Leader) "Chick" Kirkham flew for the flight sequences shot from a Harvard camera ship. The film received two nominations for the British Academy Awards.

Mosquitos are featured prominently in The Adventures of Tintin 1958 comic book album The Red Sea Sharks. They drive the plot in various ways, first as war-surplus equipment offered for sale by an arms dealer early in the story, and later in combat.

The military unit in the 1964 film 633 Squadron is equipped with de Havilland Mosquitos. The film makes use of genuine, airworthy aircraft, rather than models, for many of the scenes.

Mosquitos also play the title role of the 1969 film Mosquito Squadron, starring David McCallum and Charles Gray.

The Mosquito plays an important role with the de Havilland Vampire in Frederick Forsyth's 1975 novella The Shepherd.

Scott Summers and his younger brother Alex Summers, members of Marvel Comics' X-Men, are orphaned as children after parachuting out of their father's Mosquito when it is set ablaze by an alien attack.

Mosquitos play a central role in the 2019 graphic novel Out of the Blue written by Garth Ennis and illustrated by Keith Burns. The story features a young pilot Jamie Mckenzie who joins a Mosquito fighter-bomber unit of the Royal Air-Force and clashes with his CO.

de Havilland Puss Moth
A de Havilland Leopard Moth was painted as de Havilland DH.80 Puss Moth, VH-UQO, "My Hildegarde", race number 16, for the 1991 Australian mini-series The Great Air Race, about the 1934 London to Melbourne MacRobertson Air Race. It is also known as Half a World Away.

de Havilland Tiger Moth
A de Havilland DH.82 Tiger Moth appears in the 1952 David Lean film The Sound Barrier. In the film, Christopher Ridgefield (Denholm Elliott) is killed in a crash while nervously trying to fly his first solo in a Tiger Moth to meet the approval of his stern father Sir John (Ralph Richardson).

A Tiger Moth appears in the opening scene of the 1996 film The English Patient, flying over the Sahara Desert, carrying a man and a woman. The aircraft is shot down in flames, leaving the pilot with horrific burns. The film is based on the novel of the same name by Michael Ondaatje.

A Tiger Moth, G-ANFM, piloted by former ATA pilot Joan Hughes MBE appears in the 1968 film Thunderbird 6. During filming, the aircraft was flown under a motorway bridge over the M40 near High Wycombe, resulting in the prosecution of Hughes and the Production Director, Norman Foster.

de Havilland Vampire

De Havilland Vampires appear in the 1954 British motion picture Conflict of Wings, a drama about the conflict that arises when an RAF squadron based in Norfolk is allocated a small island to use as a range for low-level attack training only to encounter the protests of nearby villagers who want the island preserved as a bird sanctuary.

Vampires appear in the 1966 novel Shooting Script by former RAF pilot and thriller writer Gavin Lyall.

The Vampire is central to the plot of the 1975 novella, The Shepherd by British novelist Frederick Forsyth, the story of an RAF pilot attempting to fly home for Christmas from RAF Celle, Germany, to RAF Lakenheath on Christmas Eve 1957. The fact that the DH.100 was not fitted with ejection seats until about ten years later, and hence was a major challenge to bail out of, is an important element of the story.

Douglas DC-2
Douglas DC-2, PH-AJU, "Uiver", race number 44, was depicted by Douglas DC-3, VH-ANR, in the 1991 Australian mini-series The Great Air Race, about the 1934 London to Melbourne MacRobertson Trophy Air Race. It is also known as Half a World Away.

Douglas DC-3
See also C-47 Skytrain / Dakota section for military versions of the DC-3

A Douglas DC-3A of Central Airlines appears in the 1954 film Strategic Air Command as the transport that conveys a security check team into Carswell AFB, Texas.

The 1961 episode of The Twilight Zone entitled "The Arrival" features a DC-3 on Flight 107, which arrives at its destination with no one on board. It originally aired 22 September 1961.

The chief character of the 1965 novel High Citadel by Desmond Bagley is an alcoholic former Korean War fighter pilot who flies a Douglas DC-3 for a small airline in a fictional Andean country in South America. He is forced at gunpoint by his co-pilot—a Communist agent—to crash-land the DC-3 at a remote abandoned mine in the Andes so that Communists planning a coup can capture and kill a politician travelling as a passenger.

A DC-3 starred in the 1982 British television series Airline. The aircraft used to depict the DC-3 of the fictional Ruskin Air Services was also used in the 1980s television series Tenko and the 2001 series Band of Brothers.

In the 1985 two-part episode of the television series Magnum, P.I. entitled "All For One", the four main characters (Thomas, Rick, T.C. and Higgins) fly from Hawai'i to Cambodia in a DC-3 (c/n N162E) to carry out a personal mission. Several scenes are filmed both inside and outside of this aircraft.

In the 1989 comedy film Major League, the hard-luck Cleveland Indians baseball team is "upgraded" to a DC-3 for their transportation to away games.

In the 1994 film Richie Rich, the Rich family own and pilot a DC-3, named "Billion Dollar One", which crashes in the Atlantic due to a bomb on board.

The DC-3 features in a chase scene in the 2008 James Bond film Quantum of Solace.

The 2012 Canadian Broadcasting Corporation television series Arctic Air features a Yellowknife-based airline that relies on DC-3s.

The 2016 film Rules Don't Apply features a DC-3 in two sequences on land and one in air. Howard Hughes pilots the DC-3 in a risky manner while two other passengers are aboard, shutting off the engines in-air and performing a "proper glide".

Douglas DC-4

The Douglas DC-4 appears in the Ernest K. Gann novel The High and the Mighty. A former USAF Douglas C-54 Skymaster operated by Transocean Airlines portrayed the Douglas DC-4 in the John Wayne 1954 film of the same name. Ironically, this airframe was lost over the Pacific on 28 March 1964 with an engine fire just as depicted in the film. There were no survivors of the nine "souls on board" and the wreckage was never found.

Douglas DC-8
In the 1990 action film Die Hard 2, a Douglas DC-8 is given false landing instructions by terrorists and crash lands in a blizzard, resulting in fatalities to all on board. Industrial Light and Magic used a 23-foot long model to shoot the effects of the crash and explosion. Filming was done at a remote airstrip in the Mojave Desert of California. "However, shots of the passengers' frightened reactions to the initial impact, which had been shot on a set and originally cut into the movie, were so terrifying (made all the more authentic by preproduction research of Federal Aviation Administration test crashes and data from real aircraft crashes) that they were ultimately cut before the film's release." ILM constructed five DC-8 models for the production.

EB-66 Destroyer
The film Bat*21 featured an EB-66 variant of the Douglas B-66 Destroyer being shot down over North Vietnam in the beginning of the film.

English Electric Lightning
The 1976 children's book Thunder and Lightnings by Jan Mark is about the relationship of two boys – otherwise outsiders – who share an interest in aeroplanes, in particular the English Electric Lightnings flown by the local squadron. The author was awarded the Carnegie Medal in 1978 for the book.

Eurocopter Tiger
A Eurocopter EC665 Tiger attack helicopter has a starring role in the 1995 James Bond film GoldenEye.

Three Eurocopter EC665 Tigers save the day in the 2017 film Rescue Under Fire.

Eurocopter AS332 Super Puma
A Eurocopter AS332 Super Puma becomes the main protagonist of the film Rescue Under Fire. The unit used for filming in the movie was the same as in the real events.

F2H Banshee
Protagonist Lt. Harry Brubaker flew a McDonnell F2H Banshee in the 1953 James A. Michener novel The Bridges at Toko-ri. In the subsequent 1954 film adaptation, his aircraft was changed to a Grumman F9F Panther.

F3F

Flight Command, released by MGM in 1940, featured the Grumman F3F, filmed at NAS North Island, San Diego, California. Flying by Frank Clarke and Paul Mantz.

The 1941 Warner Bros. film Dive Bomber showed Grumman F3Fs. Filming began at NAS North Island, San Diego, California, on 20 March 1941.

F-4 Phantom II

US Marine aviator Lt. Col. Wilbur "Bull" Meecham flew a McDonnell Douglas F-4 Phantom II in the 1979 film The Great Santini starring Robert Duvall as Meecham.

The Gobots character Mach 3 and the Transformers character Fireflight both turn into F-4 Phantom IIs.

In the 1988 film Iron Eagle II, F-4s appear as Soviet MiGs. The aircraft were provided by the Israeli Air Force for the production.

F4F Wildcat
Grumman F4F Wildcats were shown in the critical aerial battle scenes in the film Midway.

F4U Corsair

Vought F4U Corsairs featured in the latter part of the 1951 RKO war movie Flying Leathernecks which was directed by Nicholas Ray and starred John Wayne and Robert Ryan. The film's fictional Marine Air Corps unit exchange their older fighters for new F4Us as they support the drive across the Pacific in the latter stages of the war. For the film, the producers borrowed a number of flying F4Us which were then serving as trainers at the Marine Air Base at El Toro, California, and they also incorporated some wartime colour footage of F4Us taken during WW2.

F4Us also featured in the 1952 Monogram film Flat Top which was directed by Lesley Selander and starred Sterling Hayden. In the film, Hayden plays Commander Dan Collier who takes command of a squadron of un-disciplined fighter pilots on board an aircraft carrier and is tasked with getting them combat-ready before the invasion of the Japanese-occupied Philippines in 1944. The film made extensive use of colour wartime footage of carrier-borne F4Us.

The F4U Corsair was a regularly featured aircraft of VMF-214 in the 1976–1978 television series Baa Baa Black Sheep, based on the experiences of Pappy Boyington. The series was later renamed Black Sheep Squadron.

Computer-generated images of F4U Corsairs appear in the 2006 Second World War drama Flags of Our Fathers directed by Clint Eastwood.

An F4U Corsair named Skipper Riley (voiced by Stacy Keach) is one of the characters in Disney's animated TV series and films "Air Mater" (2011), Planes (2013).

The F4U Corsair is featured in the 2022 Korean War drama film Devotion.

F-5 Freedom Fighter/Tiger II

Northrop F-5s played the part of the fictional MiG-28 enemy aircraft in the 1986 film Top Gun. 

Also played in Malayasia action drama in the 1987 film Wira Angkasa where scene Lieutenant (U) Iskandar (staring by Sabree Fadzil)

F5F Skyrocket
The sole Grumman XF5F-1 Skyrocket, which never entered production or squadron service, was incorporated as the primary mount for Blackhawk and the Blackhawk Squadron in wartime editions of the anthology series Military Comics published by Quality Comics, the first issue of which was published in August 1941. The long-running title was later acquired by DC Comics, with the squadron upgrading to more modern types.

F6F Hellcat
Grumman F6F Hellcats appeared in the 1951 motion picture Flying Leathernecks directed by Nicholas Ray and starring John Wayne. One of the pilots who flew aircraft for the aerial scenes in the production was Marine Captain Phil De Groot who, after completing work on the film, flew in the Korean War and was wounded in action. The production was filmed at a small airstrip at Camp Pendleton, California. De Groot said, "They put some sand all over the strip, and some palm trees, and built a little pagoda there, simulating Guadalcanal".

F6Fs appear in the 1964 novel The Last Tallyho by Richard Newhafer, a work inspired by the author's real-life experiences as a Hellcat pilot during WW2.

F6Fs appear in the 1978 novel Wingmen by Ensan Case, a novel depicting US Navy fighter pilots serving on a fictional aircraft carrier- the 'USS Constitution'''. The carrier's fighter squadron- VF-20- takes part in the Pacific War 1943-1944 and it centres on the experiences of two of its members- ensign Fred Trusteau and the squadron-commander, Lt Jack Hardigan.

Computer-generated images of F6F Hellcats appear in the 2002 Second World War drama Windtalkers directed by John Woo and starring Nicolas Cage.

F8F Bearcat
The F8F Bearcat are to appear in the 2022 Korean War drama film Devotion. Two flyable Bearcats were used. Footage of actors flying the aircraft was created using a two-seat Hawker Sea Fury with its rear seat modified to resemble a Bearcat cockpit and visible portions of the airframe painted like a VF-32 Bearcat.

F9F Panther

The Grumman F9F-2 Panther was prominently featured in the 1954 films Men of the Fighting Lady and The Bridges at Toko-Ri. The latter film was based on the 1953 novel of the same name, whose protagonist flew a McDonnell F2H Banshee. 

Footage of the F9F-5 Panther ramp strike accident of 23 June 1951 aboard  has been used in several films, including Men of the Fighting Lady, Midway (1976), and The Hunt For Red October (1990). The footage shows Commander George Chamberlain Duncan crash BuNo 125228, then the forward fuselage breaking away and rolling down the deck. Duncan survived the crash.

F-14 Tomcat

The Grumman F-14 Tomcat was central to the 1986 film Top Gun. The U.S. Navy provided F-14s at $7,600 per flight hour for a total bill of $886,000 ($ today). The aviation-themed film created such interest in naval aviation that the Navy set up recruitment desks outside some theaters. The F-14 also appears in the 2022 sequel Top Gun: Maverick.

Two F-14As of VF-84 from the  appeared in the 1980 film The Final Countdown. Four VF-84 planes appeared in the 1996 release Executive Decision, the Jolly Rogers' final film appearance before being disestablished. 

The military legal drama TV series JAG (1995–2005) featured lead character Harmon Rabb, a Tomcat pilot-turned-lawyer, and recurring scenes with the Tomcat. 

The Tomcat was also a central part of the Stephen Coonts novel Final Flight.

The F-14 is the primary focus of the 1987 Williams pinball machine "F-14 Tomcat" and the After Burner video game series by Sega.

F-15 Eagle

The McDonnell Douglas F-15 Eagle is one of the most recognized modern fighters; this has led to, or perhaps even been aided by, its common use in children's toys. Leader-1 of the Gobots turns into an F-15. The Transformers toy line and media have featured numerous characters who turn into F-15 Eagles, the most notable being the villain Starscream in 1984 and a group of similar Decepticons, the Seekers: Acid Storm, Thundercracker, Skywarp and Sunstorm. Although a completely unrelated design to the others, the Aerialbot Air Raid also disguises himself as an F-15.

F-15s appear in the 1980 novel Eagles by M H Davis, a work which portrays pilots of the USAF.

The F-15 is featured in the 1997 film Air Force One. The Eagle was also shown in advertisements for the 2000 film Thirteen Days. The ads were withdrawn when it came to the attention of New Line Cinema that the F-15, which first flew in 1972, was out of place for a film set in 1962. This was problematic for New Line, who had termed the film a "by-the-numbers recreation" and "close to perfect". A New Line spokesman said the advertisement was created by an outside agency.

F-15Js and F-15DJs of the JASDF appear prominently in the 2004 film Ultraman: The Next. The film's protagonist, Shunichi Maki, is a prestigious pilot of the F-15, and encounters the enigmatic Ultraman 'The Next' while flying the aircraft.

The F-15 has appeared in numerous video games, including the 1985 Microprose title F-15 Strike Eagle and its two sequels, 1989's F-15 Strike Eagle II and 1992's F-15 Strike Eagle III. F-15 also appears in three of Jane's Combat Simulations games: 1998's F-15 and IAF, and 1999's USAF.

F-16 Fighting Falcon

A number of video games have featured the General Dynamics F-16 Fighting Falcon : the Falcon series (1984-2005), F-16 Combat Pilot (1989), F-16 Multirole Fighter (1998), F-16 Aggressor (1999) and many others.

The Transformers Aerialbot Skydive and Decepticon Dreadwind disguise themselves as F-16 Fighting Falcons. The Transformers character Needlenose disguises himself as an F-16XL.

The Falcon was one of the stars of the 1986 film Iron Eagle. The US Air Force refused to assist with production of the film because it found the plot about a teenager flying an F-16 into a foreign country to be "a little off the wall".

The 1986 action-adventure romantic comedy film The Jewel of the Nile featured a brutal dictator's personal F-16 as the key element in the protagonists (played by Kathleen Turner and Michael Douglas) escaping from a fortified town.

The aircraft was also featured in the HBO 1992 production Afterburn. A dramatization of true events, the F-16 was the subject of a protracted legal battle over the safety of the design.

The F-16 was featured in the 2002 film The Sum of All Fears.

Starting in 2007, the F-16 became one of two aircraft (along with the Cirrus SR22) to be featured in Google Earth Flight Simulator.

F/A-18 Hornet
The McDonnell Douglas F/A-18 Hornet appears in the 1994 film Clear and Present Danger which was directed by Phillip Noyce. The jet drops a laser-guided bomb on a car at a drug lord's villa, being laser designated by a special forces team.

In the 1996 Michael Bay-directed film The Rock, F/A-18s attack the prison on Alcatraz Island in the final scenes.

The F/A-18 Hornet was prominently featured in the 1996 film Independence Day and was filmed using F/A-18 squadrons belonging to the 3rd Marine Corps Aircraft Wing at El Toro and Miramar, in California.

F/A-18A Hornets play a crucial role in the climax of the 1998 film Godzilla, in which the planes first destroy the Baby Godzillas in Madison Square Garden by demolishing the building with AGM-84 Harpoon missiles, then kill Godzilla himself by firing additional Harpoon missiles at the monster after he became entangled in the cables of Brooklyn Bridge.

The F/A-18 Hornet appeared briefly in the 2003 film Tears of the Sun in the final, climactic battle, helping to save the surviving SEAL team members.

F/A-18E/F Super Hornet
The aircraft appears in the 2000 video game F/A-18, part of Jane's Combat Simulations series.

The two-seater F/A-18F Super Hornet was featured in the 2001 film Behind Enemy Lines, directed by John Moore and starring Owen Wilson and Gene Hackman. The plot begins with a Super Hornet being shot down over Bosnia.

In the 2013 Disney animated film Planes, the characters Bravo and Echo are based on the F/A-18E Super Hornet.

F/A-18E and -F Super Hornets appear in the 2022 film Top Gun: Maverick.

F-20 Tigershark
The Northrop F-20 Tigershark appears a number of times in Kaoru Shintani's manga/animated franchise Area 88, as a personal unit of main character Shin Kazama.Area 88. Act 2: Requirements of Wolves. Studio Pierrot, 1985–1986.

Although the F-20 never entered service, in Barrett Tillman's 1991 novel Warriors, the Royal Saudi Air Force orders over a hundred of them. The RSAF assigns the fighter to select pilots who graduate from a localized version of Top Gun established by former USAF and USN pilots. The bigger plot of the novel involves the Saudi pilots joining a pan-Arab attack against Israel.

F-22 Raptor

After appearing briefly in the 2003 Hulk film, the F-22 made its major Hollywood debut in the 2007 film Transformers and its 2009 sequel as the form taken by the Decepticon character Starscream in addition to numerous USAF fighters that engaged during the initial and climactic battles. The film crew was allowed to film actual Raptors in flight, unlike previous computer-generated appearances, because of the military's support of director Michael Bay. The Raptors were filmed at Edwards Air Force Base.

Toys released for Starscream were replica F-22 Raptor models. These models were reused for other characters in the line, like Thundercracker, Skywarp and Ramjet, that also turned into F-22 Raptors.

Although the live-action 2007 film Transformers made Starscream the best-known Transformer that turns into an F-22, there were other F-22 Transformers before it. For instance the 1997 Machine Wars versions of Megatron and Megaplex transformed into F-22s.

The real Raptor made its next big screen appearance in Iron Man, in which a Raptor call sign "Whiplash 1" lost its left wing during a mid-air collision with the Iron Man armor.

In the 2013 film Olympus Has Fallen, computer animation was used to depict F-22 Raptors intercepting an armed AC-130 attacking Washington, D.C.; two F-22s are shot down before a third hits the AC-130 with a missile, causing it to crash.

The plane is the subject of a flight-simulation video game, F-22 Interceptor, which was released by Electronic Arts and Ingram Entertainment for the Sega Mega Drive console in 1991.

The F-22 Raptor, specifically the F-22A variant, is a major aircraft in the Ace Combat series, being prominently featured on the box art of several entries and being usable in a majority of the games in the series; one appearance is in 7: Skies Unknown, which displays the F-22 on its box and used it in pre-release marketing. The FB-22 also appears in several other games in the series, starting with 5: The Unsung War.

F-35 Lightning II

The first major film appearance of a representation of a Lockheed Martin F-35 Lightning II was 2006's Superman Returns. During this film, a pair of F-35A fighters escorted the modified Boeing 777 mothership for an experimental NASA spaceplane. This visualization was a combination of an actual cockpit and CGI for the aircraft in flight.

The next major film appearance of an F-35 was in Live Free or Die Hard (released as Die Hard 4.0 outside North America) in 2007. The film used a combination of a full-scale model and CGI effects.

The Transformers character of the Autobot Breakaway and its redeco the Decepticon Thrust from the Revenge of the Fallen toy both disguise themselves as F-35s. Breakaway appears as a playable character in the 2009 Revenge of the Fallen video game.

F-35s are depicted in the 2012 film The Avengers. The film was originally intended to include real F-35s, but the United States Department of Defense objected to the depiction of F-22s and F-35s as under the control of S.H.I.E.L.D., a covert, "extra-governmental" organization whose loyalties are unclear, so CGI aircraft were substituted instead.

Hal Jordan and Carol Ferris fly F-35s in a simulated dogfight against the UCAVs Carol's company is trying to sell to the US Department of Defense in the 2011 film Green Lantern.

A squadron of F-35s engages General Zod's ship in the 2013 film Man of Steel.

F-84 Thunderjet, Thunderstreak
For the 1955 biographical film The McConnell Story about ace Joseph C. McConnell, eight Republic F-84s of the 614th Fighter-Bomber Squadron donned dark blue paint with red stars to portray MiG-15s doing mock battle for the cameras with F-86 Sabres of the 366th Fighter-Bomber Squadron, both units based at Alexandria AFB, Louisiana. Air Defense Command headquarters notified its pilots in January 1955 that the mock MiGs would be operating over portions of the southwestern US.

F-86 Sabre
The North American F-86 Sabre appears in the 1956 novel The Hunters by James Salter, and the 1958 film of the same name, set in Korea, features North American F-86 Sabres.

F-86s appear in the 1957 junior fiction novel Sabre Pilot by Stephen W. Meader about a youngster named Kirk Owen who enlists in the USAF and serves as a fighter pilot in the Korean War.

F-86s were a feature in the 1958 film Jet Attack which was directed by Edward L. Cahn and starred John Agar and Audrey Totter. The film, also released as Jet Alert and Through Hell to Glory, was a drama set in the Korean War about a pair of pilots who parachute behind North Korean lines to rescue a captured scientist. The film, a low budget production, relied heavily on stock footage of F-86s for the aerial scenes.

F-86s appear in the 1959 novel MiG Alley by Robert Eunson which portrays a pilot Captain Homer 'Mac' McCullough who flies F-86s during the Korean War and is frustrated at being forbidden to engage enemy MiGs beyond the Yalu River.

Desmond Bagley's 1965 novel High Citadel features F-86 Sabres, which make up the frontline equipment of the air force of the fictional South American country in which the book is set. There are four squadrons of Sabres; two are loyal to the current corrupt government; one is secretly loyal to a reformist politician who is returning from exile to take over the country; and the fourth is secretly loyal to Communist forces who are attempting to kill the politician. The latter part of the novel features a dogfight between a Sabre flown by one of the main characters—a CIA agent and former Sabre pilot who fought in the Korean War—and aircraft of the Communist squadron.

F-86F Sabres of the JASDF regularly appear in the Showa era of kaiju films produced by Toho, with the aircraft appearing most prominently during a sequence in Godzilla where two Sabres attack the titular monster after he leaves the devastated city of Tokyo.

In the 1981 dystopian film The Last Chase, retired pilot J.G. Williams (played by Burgess Meredith) and his F-86 Sabre play the antagonist in attempting to track down and destroy the protagonist Franklyn Hart (played by Lee Majors). After becoming sympathetic to Hart's cause, Williams sacrifices himself in a kamikaze-style attack against a laser installation to protect Hart.

A Sabre plays an important role in the 1999 film comedy Blast from the Past which stars Brendan Fraser and Christopher Walken. During the Cuban Missile Crisis, a Sabre pilot is forced to eject over a residential area in the US and the aircraft just happens to crash onto the house of an eccentric father who is sheltering with his family in a large underground bomb shelter he has constructed. Believing the crash to be the impact of a nuclear bomb, the family remain underground for 35 years.

F-101 Voodoo

A pair of McDonnell F-101B Voodoos fly over the Russian submarine Спрут at the end of the 1966 comedy The Russians Are Coming, the Russians Are Coming, directed by Norman Jewison. Although the film is set in New England, it was filmed on the West Coast and the fighters were from the 84th Fighter-Interceptor Squadron, based at the now-closed Hamilton Air Force Base, California.

F-104 Starfighter
Gen. Charles "Chuck" Yeager's 10 December 1963 flying accident during a test flight in a modified rocket-boosted Lockheed NF-104A Starfighter was featured in The Right Stuff motion picture. The aircraft used for filming was a standard German Luftwaffe F-104G, flying with its wingtip fuel tanks removed; it otherwise lacked any of the NF-104A's modifications, most visibly the rocket engine pod at the base of the vertical stabilizer.

The F-104 is featured heavily in the 1964 film The Starfighters, directed by Will Zens and starring future US Congressman Bob Dornan. The film later appeared on the Comedy Central series Mystery Science Theater 3000 as the subject of episode #612.

An F-104 Starfighter flown by Captain John Christopher, USAF, intercepts the USS Enterprise after the ship is thrown back in time by an encounter with a previously unmapped "black star" in Star Trek first-season episode 1/19, "Tomorrow Is Yesterday", as the starship is struggling to climb out of Earth's atmosphere over Omaha, Nebraska.

Footage of an F-104 featured in the opening scenes of the science-fiction motion picture The Bamboo Saucer (1968), playing the role of an experimental jet called the "X-109" whose pilot Fred Norwood (John Ericson) encounters a UFO while carrying out a test flight.

An F-104 made regular appearances on the 1960s television sitcom I Dream of Jeannie. Leading man Major Anthony Nelson (Larry Hagman), a pilot in the US Air Force, was often to be seen landing and climbing out of the cockpit of an F-104A. That particular aircraft – 56-817 – later became part of the collection of the Pacific Aviation Museum on Ford Island, Oahu, Hawaii.

Captain Lockheed and the Starfighters is a 1974 satirical concept album by Robert Calvert and others, telling a fictionalized tale of the F-104G's acquisition by and service with the German Air Force. The album included tracks with names such as "the Widowmaker" and "Catch a Falling Starfighter".

F-117 Nighthawk

The Lockheed F-117 Nighthawk was the subject of the 1991 MicroProse game F-117A Nighthawk Stealth Fighter 2.0 and the 1993 Sega Mega Drive-exclusive F-117 Night Storm.

The plane also appeared in the 1996 action movie Executive Decision starring Kurt Russell, Steven Seagal, Halle Berry, John Leguizamo, Oliver Platt, Joe Morton, David Suchet, and B.D. Wong. In this movie, the plane is called an experimental "Remora F117x" aircraft and capable of carrying passengers and transferring them in-flight onto another aircraft.

Fairchild UC-61 Forwarder
A former US Army Air Force Fairchild UC-61A Forwarder, painted in USAAF colours, makes a brief appearance to represent the Noorduyn UC-64A Norseman in which big band leader Glenn Miller disappeared in December 1944, in the 1954 Universal International Pictures film The Glenn Miller Story.

The same aircraft was also featured in a 1964 episode of Michael Bentine's BBC TV comedy programme, It's a Square World, about a shoestring airline with a staff of two. Filming took a day at Elstree Aerodrome, Herts. In 1965, it appeared in an episode of the ITV programme, The Moonraker.

Fairchild Hiller FH-227
When the Fairchild Hiller FH-227D operating as Uruguayan Air Force (Fuerza Aérea Uruguaya) Flight 571 T-571 crashed in the Argentine Andes on 13 October 1972, it began a tale of amazing human survival for the 16 of the 45 on board who were rescued over two months later, after two passengers walked to civilization. The survivors' story was published in Alive: The Story of the Andes Survivors, a critically acclaimed book by Piers Paul Read, in 1974. When the story was filmed in 1992 as Alive, directed by Frank Marshall, a similar FH-227 marked as the doomed aircraft was used for some shots, while Industrial Light & Magic depicted the crash using an eight-foot breakaway model, designed to shear at mid-fuselage. The nose and tail were heavily reinforced while a non-reinforced midsection was built up of plastic, foil, wires and metals so that when it broke it would have the layered metal look of a real airframe breaking up. A cable system was rigged to fly the model, which was on an aligned track, into the miniature mountain, hitting the "sweet spot" on the fuselage, a weakened area barely three inches long.

Fairey Fox
The Fairey Fox I, G-ACXO, race number 35, which participated in the 1934 London to Melbourne MacRobertson Trophy Air Race, was portrayed in the 1991 Australian mini-series The Great Air Race, also known as Half a World Away, by an unlikely Boeing Stearman.

Fairey Swordfish

Two Fairey Swordfish starred in the 1960 film Sink the Bismarck!. Swordfish LS326 was marked as "5A" of 825 Naval Air Squadron, while NF389 was marked as LS423 / "5B".

Fairey Battle
Some Fairey Battles appear in the 1942 movie Captains of the Clouds. The movie is in colour and features scenes of James Cagney's character flying one.

Focke-Wulf Fw 190
Focke-Wulf Fw 190s appear in the 1970 novel Betrayed Skies by Rudolf Braunburg which depicts a Luftwaffe fighter unit based in Poland in 1944.

Modified North American T-6 Texans portrayed Focke-Wulf Fw 190s in the 1977 film A Bridge Too Far.

A new-build Fw 190 A-8/N participated in the 2007 Finnish war film Tali-Ihantala 1944, painted in the same markings as Oberst Erich Rudorffer's aircraft in 1944.

Fw 190s appear in the French graphic novel The Grand Duke (2012) written by Yann, illustrated by Romain Hugault and depicting aerial combat between the Soviet air force and the German Luftwaffe over the Eastern Front in the latter stages of the Second World War.

Focke-Wulf Triebflügel
A Focke-Wulf Fw Triebflügel aircraft was featured in the 2011 American superhero film Captain America: The First Avenger, with the supervillain Red Skull making his first escape in this rocket-aircraft. The scene accurately depicts the rocket and ramjet start and initial climb out of the Triebflügel. Historically, the Triebflügel had only reached wind-tunnel testing when the Allied forces reached the production facilities, and no complete prototype was ever built. CGI vehicles designed for the film were based on real historical aircraft such as the Triebflügel.

Fokker Eindecker
A Fokker E.III Eindecker appeared in the BBC TV series Wings (1977–1978), a drama series about pilots of the Royal Flying Corps in the First World War.

Fokker Dr.I

A scarlet-painted Fokker Dr.I triplane featured in the DC comic Enemy Ace and was the mount of the central character Baron Hans von Hammer, a German fighter pilot in the First World War. Debuting in 1965, the comic was written by Robert Kanigher and drawn by Joe Kubert and the character has been revived several times since by other writers & artists.

A pair of Dr.Is appear in the 1966 film epic The Blue Max, directed by John Guillermin and based on the 1964 novel of the same name by Jack D. Hunter. In the film, rival pilots Bruno Stachel (George Peppard) and von Klugermann (Jeremy Kemp) try to out-do one another in a test of nerves by flying their triplanes under a bridge. The scene was filmed at Formoy Viaduct in Ireland and stunt pilot Derek Piggott was obliged to fly a Dr.I under the bridge, through either the wide or narrow spans, a total of 32 times.

A Dr.I appears in the 1971 film Von Richthofen and Brown (released in the US as The Red Baron) which was directed by Roger Corman and starred John Phillip Law as the famous German ace. The aircraft makes its first appearance at a cocktail party thrown by the aircraft's designer Anthony Fokker (played by Hurd Hatfield) who shows off his creation to guest of honour Manfred von Richthofen (Law) but the latter's eyes are drawn more to Fokker's attractive mistress.

Fokker Dr.Is appear en masse in the 2006 aerial film Flyboys directed by Tony Bill and starring James Franco.

Fokker Dr.Is also appear in the 2008 German film Der Rote Baron, a biopic about the famous First World War ace Manfred von Richthofen.

Fokker D.VII
The 1927 William Wellman film Wings featured a Fokker D.VII among many types depicting World War I aircraft.

A Fokker D.VII is flown in a dogfight by Baron Heinrich von Frohleich versus Race Bannon in a SPAD S.XIII in episode 10 of Jonny Quest, "Shadow of the Condor", first aired 20 November 1964.

Ford Trimotor

John Wayne was depicted piloting a Ford Trimotor in several episodes of the 1932 serial film Hurricane Express. A Ford Trimotor appeared in Chapter 1 of Flash Gordon (Universal, 1936). Director Howard Hawks' 1939 film Only Angels Have Wings features a Trimotor that catches fire after a freak accident with a condor, eventually performing an emergency landing on an airfield. A real and a model Trimotor were used for the sequence.

A Ford 4-AT-E Trimotor, N8407, appeared in the 1965 comedy The Family Jewels "flown" by Jerry Lewis. This aircraft is now owned by the Experimental Aircraft Association.

The Ford 5-AT-B Trimotor currently owned by Kermit Weeks' Fantasy of Flight Museum was featured early in the opening of the 1984 film Indiana Jones and the Temple of Doom.

A Trimotor was also featured in Brian DePalma's 1987 version of The Untouchables with Kevin Costner and Sean Connery.

A Ford Trimotor 4AT-B featured in the 2009 film Amelia, a biopic of aviator Amelia Earhart starring Hilary Swank and Richard Gere. The aircraft featured in the film belonged to the Golden Wings Museum, Minnesota.

GAF Nomad
The Government Aircraft Factories (GAF) Nomad, an Australian-built twin-engine STOL (Short Take-Off and Landing) aircraft, was a regular feature on the successful Australian TV series The Flying Doctors which aired on the Nine Network 1986–1993. The GAF Nomad had a controversial history with a high accident rate. Of the 172 that were constructed, 32 were involved in major hull-loss accidents, resulting in 76 fatalities including GAF test pilot Stuart Pearce (father of actor Guy Pearce).

Gee Bee Racer
Two Gee Bee Model Z Super Sportster racing aircraft were featured in the 1991 Walt Disney film The Rocketeer.

Kermit Weeks, founder of Fantasy of Flight, used a Gee Bee Model Z as his main character "Zee" in a 2008 series of children's books set in the interwar period.

A Mexican Gee Bee Racer named "El Chupacabra" is one of the characters in the 2013 Disney animated film Planes.

Gloster Gladiator
Gloster Gladiators appear in the Second World War novel Signed with their Honour, written in 1942 by Australian author and war correspondent James Aldridge. The novel is set during the Axis invasion of Greece in 1940–41 and the central character is a British pilot named John Quayle who flies Gladiators with No. 80 Squadron RAF. An attempt in 1943 to make a film based on the novel was abandoned when two Gladiators were destroyed in a mid-air collision during the production.

Gloster Meteor
A privately owned Gloster Meteor TT20, N94749 appeared in the two-part 1976 episode, "The Feminum Mystique", of the first season of the Wonder Woman television series, as the experimental "XPJ-1" fighter which is stolen by the Nazis. This airframe has been donated to the Edwards Air Force Base Flight Test Center museum. The episode title was borrowed from Betty Friedan's 1963 book of a similar title, which is widely credited with sparking the beginning of second-wave feminism in the US.

A Gloster Meteor T.7, either WA634 or WA638, owned by Martin-Baker appeared in the episode "Many Happy Returns" of the 1967 British TV series The Prisoner.

Goodyear Blimp

The 1977 John Frankenheimer film Black Sunday features the Goodyear Blimp as the vehicle which Black September terrorists plan to hijack and attack the Super Bowl, played in the Orange Bowl in Miami.

Gotha G.IV
A Gotha G.IV appears in the 2006 First World War aerial film Flyboys directed by Tony Bill and starring James Franco. To depict the bomber, the producers used both computer-generated imagery and a replica of the forward fuselage of a Gotha, now displayed in a museum at RAF Manston.

Grumman G-21 Goose
A Grumman G-21 Goose, painted red, white and black, named "Cutter's Goose", was the main transport of protagonist Jake Cutter (played by Stephen Collins) in the early 1982–83 adventure television series, Tales of the Gold Monkey, and used to transport Cutter and his allies among various south Pacific islands in the late 1930s setting of the show.

Grumman HU-16 Albatross
The 1964 film Flight from Ashiya, starring Richard Widmark, Yul Brynner and George Chakiris, follows the crews of two Grumman HU-16 Albatross of the USAF Air Rescue Service as they attempt to rescue the survivors of a Japanese shipwreck in the North China Sea.

The 2010 film The Expendables also features an Albatross as the protagonists' private airplane.

Grumman J2F Duck
A Grumman J2F Duck was the primary plot device of the 1971 United Artists film Murphy's War, starring Peter O'Toole as the title character. Stunt flying was done by Frank Tallman. The J2F-6 which starred in the film, BuNo 33587, afterwards resided in the Weeks Air Museum in Florida, USA (now the Fantasy of Flight Museum).

Grumman TBF / TBM Avenger
The 1944 film Wing and a Prayer is the fictional account of a torpedo squadron equipped with Grumman TBF Avengers in early 1942. The movie culminates when the squadron fights at the Battle of Midway.

A group of Avengers appears in the opening scene of Steven Spielberg's 1977 sci-fi film Close Encounters of the Third Kind. In the scene, a group of officials arrive at an isolated cantina in Mexico's Sonora Desert where the five Avengers of 'Flight-19' have mysteriously appeared overnight. Flight 19 was the infamous training flight of five TBMs that vanished without trace after taking off from Fort Lauderdale, Florida, on 5 December 1945. One of the TBMs featured in the scene was the TBM-3E (BuNo 53503) now owned and flown by the Rocky Mountain Wing of the Commemorative Air Force (CAF).

Grumman Widgeon
A Grumman G-44 Widgeon opened each week's episode of the 1978–1984 television series Fantasy Island.

Grumman X-29
The Transformers Autobot named Dogfight disguises himself as a Grumman X-29.

In Kaoru Shintani's manga series Area 88, main character Shin Kazama pilots an X-29 during the final battles.

HAL HF-24 Marut
The Bollywood war film Border is a fictionalized account of the 1971 Battle of Longewala between India and Pakistan. In the film a formation of HAL HF-24 Marut fighter-bombers of the Indian Air Force bomb Pakistani armoured ground forces consisting of 300 tanks and Armored Personnel Carriers.

Harrier family

The Gobots character Royal-T and the Transformers Aerialbot named Slingshot disguise themselves as a Harrier. In the Revenge of the Fallen Decepticon character Dirge also became a Harrier. This design was later used for the Decepticon Jetblade.

A Royal Air Force Harrier was used by MI6 in the 1987 James Bond film The Living Daylights to smuggle KGB defector Georgi Koskov out of Austria.

Two AV-8B Harrier IIs were used in the 1994 film True Lies. The aircraft was prominent in the latter part of the film, being used by Arnold Schwarzenegger's character to rescue his daughter from terrorists in a Miami high rise and shoot down their helicopter.

The Harrier was one of the aircraft types featured in the short-lived 1982 BBC-TV series Squadron which was a drama about a fictional Royal Air Force unit, 373 Squadron. The unit was a Rapid Deployment Force and featured an unusual mix of aircraft including Harriers, C-130 Hercules and Puma helicopters. The series ran for 10 episodes.

Handley Page Halifax
The novel A God in Ruins (2015) by Kate Atkinson features the Handley Page Halifax heavy bomber. The central character, Teddy Todd, is a Halifax pilot serving with RAF Bomber Command during WW2 and flies over 70 night-bombing missions over Germany.

Handley Page Victor
The 1962 British film The Iron Maiden features a Handley Page Victor bomber as a fictional supersonic passenger-carrying airliner designed by the protagonist. At the end of the film, this fictional airliner is named after the eponymous traction engine.

Hawker Hunter
The 1952 British film The Sound Barrier features Hawker Hunter fighters.

Hawker Hunter Mk 4s play a major role in the 1957 British Cinemascope motion picture High Flight directed by John Gilling and starring Ray Milland.

A formation of Hawker Hunters of the Chilean Air Force appeared in the 2004 Chilean film Machuca in which they bomb the Palacio de La Moneda.

The music video for the 2000 electronica single "Sunset (Bird of Prey)" by Fatboy Slim features a Hawker Hunter trainer in United States Air Force livery, as the titular "Bird of Prey".

Hawker Hurricane

Along with the Supermarine Spitfire, the Hawker Hurricane is very strongly linked to the Battle of Britain in summer 1940, where the Royal Air Force fought the German Luftwaffe over the skies of Britain for air superiority. As such it has been featured in many works of fiction related to the Battle of Britain.

A number of Hawker Hurricanes, including the last one built, registered G-AMAU, "The Last of the Many", and five provided by the Portuguese Air Force, which flew the type until mid-1954, were used in the making of the Templar Productions Ltd. production provisionally titled "Hawks in the Sun", based on the book What Are Your Angels Now? by Wing Commander A. J. C. Pelham Groom, then released in March 1952 as Angels One Five.

Hurricanes were shown in the 1956 British film Reach For the Sky starring Kenneth More and directed by Lewis Gilbert and based on the biography of Douglas Bader by Paul Brickhill. One Hurricane which featured in a static role in the film was the Mk. I, P2617, now preserved at the Royal Air Force Museum, Hendon. Another, which flew in the aerial scenes, was the Mk-IIc, LF363, now operated by the Battle of Britain Memorial Flight based at Conningsby, UK.

The Hawker Hurricane was shown in the 1969 film Battle of Britain. Three airworthy Hurricanes were located and used for the filming.

A Hawker Hurricane was the fighter flown by the Second World War character Johnny Redburn in the long-running British comic strip Johnny Red which was published in Battle Picture Weekly 1977–1987. The storyline featured Redburn, having been discharged from the RAF and joining the Merchant Navy, commandeers a CAM ship's Hurricane during an attack on a convoy (after the official pilot is killed), and ends up stranded in Soviet Russia at the height of the war against the Germans in which he fights alongside Russian pilots. The comic was written by Tom Tully and illustrated by Joe Colquhoun, John Cooper and Carlos Pino. The character was revived in 2017 for the graphic novel mini-series Johnny Red: The Hurricane written by Garth Ennis and illustrated by Keith Burns.

The Hawker Hurricane Mk. I is the aircraft for the fictional RAF pilots depicted in the 1983 novel Piece of Cake by Derek Robinson. The 1988 miniseries based on the novel used Supermarine Spitfires instead of Hurricanes.

The 2006 novel Blue Man Falling by Frank Barnard also featured Hurricanes.

Heinkel He 111
The Heinkel He 111 has a prominent role in the movie Battle of Britain.

Hiller UH-12 / OH-23 Raven
A Hiller UH-12 appears in the 1951 sci-fi film When Worlds Collide directed by George Pal and based on the 1933 novel of the same name. The helicopter is used to render assistance to flood-stranded refugees and to rescue a young boy stranded on a rooftop.

A UH-12C was used to attack James Bond in the 1963 film From Russia with Love.

A Hiller UH-12E suffered a tail-rotor strike during filming of the 1978 film Attack of the Killer Tomatoes. Footage of the crash was used in the film. The helicopter pilot and actors on board escaped without serious injury, but the helicopter was destroyed.

Hindenburg
The Zeppelin LZ 129 Hindenburg was the subject of the 1975 film The Hindenburg, which speculated sabotage as the cause of the 1937 disaster at Naval Air Station Lakehurst, New Jersey. The studio model of the airship is now displayed in the Smithsonian Institution's National Air and Space Museum in Washington, D.C.

Hispano Aviación HA-1112

Twenty-eight former Spanish Air Force Hispano Aviación HA-1112s were used in the 1969 film Battle of Britain as "stand-ins" to depict Messerschmitt Bf 109 fighters of the Luftwaffe, These aircraft included 27 single-seat M1Ls and one two-seat M4L. Eighteen were flown, six could taxi, the rest used to dress sets. In the mid-1960s at the time aircraft began to be collected for the film to be made, the only genuine Bf 109s known to exist were unairworthy examples in museums such as the Imperial War Museum and the South African National Museum of Military History or in private hands; whereas the HA-1112 was just being retired from service with the Spanish Air Force and several airframes in flyable condition and some 50 dismantled Buchóns were up for disposal bid. The four airframes acquired by the Confederate Air Force just prior to the start of filming "were the first Buchóns in truly civilian ownership, early members of the fledgling warbird preservation movement."

Several Buchóns were painted in RAF markings for the 1969 Italian "macaroni combat" war film Eagles Over London, also known as Battle Squadron and Battle Command, directed by Enzo G. Castellari. "In 1979, much of the footage shot for Eagles Over London appeared in the dire George Peppard film Hell to Victory".

Three of the Buchóns were "hastily converted into P-51B Mustangs for the 1970 film Patton. This involved the attachment of a large Mustang-esque fibreglass air intake to the underside of the fuselage."

One CAF Buchón flew as a Bf 109B in Condor Legion markings for the film The Hindenburg which began filming in August 1974.

Buchóns, again depicting Bf 109s, made an appearance on the 1980 ABC-network TV sci-fi series Galactica 1980, a short-lived spin-off from the original Battlestar Galactica series. The heroes travel back in time in their space Vipers to Earth during the Second World War and encounter the Luftwaffe. The footage of Buchóns consisted of out-takes from the 1969 film Battle of Britain.

One Buchón, which had taxied in The Battle of Britain, flew in the 1988 LWT miniseries Piece of Cake, and was one of three flyable HA-1112s used to depict Bf 109s in the 1990 film Memphis Belle. The Piece of Cake Buchón also appeared in the 1991 ITV television miniseries A Perfect Hero.

A Buchón now with the Planes of Fame Air Museum, Chino, California, is under repair after a landing accident at Lydd in Kent during filming of the 2001 film Pearl Harbor in 2000.

A former training airframe that did not appear in the Battle of Britain but which was restored to Bf 109G-10 standard in the early 1990s, and operated by the Old Flying Machine Company, appeared in the 1995 telemovie Over Here starring Martin Clunes.

A Buchon appears in the 2017 Christopher Nolan film Dunkirk.

 Hughes 500 / OH-6 / MH-6 / MD 500 
In the 1983 film Blue Thunder, the antagonist Colonel Cochrane flew a heavily armed MD 500.

Three Hughes OH-6A Cayuse helicopters make up part of the strike package against Ernst Stavro Blofeld's oil rig command center in the 1971 James Bond film Diamonds Are Forever.

A Hughes 500C takes part in the 1973 telemovie Birds of Prey, in which a traffic reporter, played by David Janssen, gets into an aerial duel with a gang of bank robbers, who have their own getaway helicopter, an Aérospatiale Lama.

A pair of Hughes 500 helicopters appear in the 1978 film Capricorn One, near the climactic ending where they get entangled with a crop duster biplane.

"240-Robert" is an American television series that ran on ABC from 1979 to 1981. The series was about a specialized unit of the Los Angeles County Sheriff's Department (LASD), that used four–wheel drive vehicles and a Hughes 500 helicopter.

In the 1980s television series Magnum, P.I., Thomas Magnum's friend and fellow war veteran T.C. (for Theodore Calvin) flies a civilian Hughes 500D as a tourist charter Island Hoppers business.

MD Helicopters MH-6 Little Bird helicopters provided air support for the downed Blackhawk's crash site in the 2001 film Black Hawk Down.

In the film Fire Birds (1990), a drug runner's Scorpion helicopter (portrayed by an MD 500) ambushes a US Army AH-1 Cobra during the opening sequence.

Hughes H-4 Hercules (Spruce Goose)

The Hughes H-4 Hercules, also known as the Hercules HK-1 and "The Spruce Goose", is a large flying boat which has made a number of appearances in fiction.

The aircraft was central to the plot of the 1987 Hanna-Barbera animated film Yogi Bear and the Magical Flight of the Spruce Goose.

In the 1988 biopic Tucker: The Man and His Dream, a pivotal meeting between automaker Preston Tucker and Howard Hughes takes place in front of the Hercules, within its hangar, where Hughes briefly tells Tucker that whether the Hercules flies is not the point, as well as how to circumvent the "establishment" and Senator Ferguson.

In the 1991 adventure film The Rocketeer, hero Cliff Secord uses a large-scale model of the Hughes H-4 Hercules to escape some eager federal agents and Howard Hughes himself. After Secord glides the model to safety, Hughes expresses relief that the craft would actually fly.

In the video game L.A. Noire (2011) the player is able to enter the aircraft. Additionally, exterior and interior views of the H-4 Hercules aircraft appear in the opening introduction of the DLC mission, "Nicholson Electroplating".

The aircraft was the center of a con job in TNT's drama series Leverage, Episode 5.01 "The Very Big Bird Job", which aired 15 July 2012, involved "selling" the Hercules. Part of the con involves convincing the mark that Hughes secretly gave the aircraft stealth capabilities.

Hughes XF-11
The 7 July 1946 maiden flight of the Hughes XF-11 reconnaissance design which ended in a crash in Beverly Hills, California, severely injuring pilot Howard Hughes was depicted in a 1977 telemovie, The Amazing Howard Hughes (with a P-38 Lightning standing in for the XF-11), and again in the 2004 Martin Scorsese film, The Aviator, with the aircraft depicted by a mock-up with flight rendered through CGI.

ICON A5

The ICON A5 is the starter aircraft in Microsoft Flight. It is included in all of the editions of Microsoft Flight Simulator 2020.

Ikarus Kurir
The 1973 film The Fifth Offensive, starring Richard Burton, had an Ikarus Kurir L playing the part of a Luftwaffe Fieseler Storch.

Junkers Ju 52/3m
A Swiss Air Force Junkers Ju 52/3m was used in the 1968 action thriller Where Eagles Dare. The opening scene of the film shows the camouflaged Ju-52 flying at night over and through the Bavarian Alps en route to where the team of Allied infiltrators are dropped by parachute. The same aircraft rescues the main characters at the conclusion of the film.

A Ju-52 appears in the 1973 novel Band of Brothers by Ernest K. Gann in which an abandoned example is resurrected and flown on two engines by a team of pilots.

Two Ju 52s appeared in one of the early scenes in the 2008 Second World War film Valkyrie directed by Bryan Singer and starring Tom Cruise. One aircraft was painted in a Luftwaffe scheme, the other in an all-silver finish.

In the second season of the television series Babylon Berlin, characters Gereon Rath and Reinhold Gräf use a Ju 52 to inspect the then-secret German-operated Lipetsk fighter-pilot school in the Soviet Union. The appearance is anachronistic, as the episode takes place before the aircraft entered production.

 Junkers Ju 87 
The 1941 Nazi propaganda film Stukas, produced by Karl Ritter, described the wartime exploits of a squadron of Junkers Ju 87 "Stuka" dive bombers and their pilots during the Invasion of France during World War II.

Junkers W 33

A replica Junkers W 33 appears in the 1985 Australian TV mini-series Flight into Hell, a dramatisation of the 1932 Kimberley rescue of German aviators Hans Bertram and Adolph Klausmann who, during an attempt to circumnavigate the world, crash-landed in a remote region of North-West Australia.

Kaman SH-2 Seasprite
The Transformers Combaticon named Vortex disguises itself as an SH-2G Super Seasprite.

 Kamov Ka-27 
A pair of Ka-27 Helix helicopters appear throughout Martin Campbell's 1994 film No Escape. The helicopters transport inmates to a prison island, and patrol the shoreline for would be escapees.

Kellett K-3 Autogyro
In the 1934 screwball comedy It Happened One Night, the foppish bridegroom "King" Westley (Jameson Thomas) arrives at his own wedding "piloting" a Kellett Autogiro Corporation K-3 autogyro, c/n 16, NC12691, (although the real pilot can be seen crouching in the cockpit after Westley deplanes). The same autogyro appeared in the 1933 W. C. Fields film International House.

L-5 Sentinel
A Stinson L-5A Sentinel was shown in the 1969 Mike Nichols film Catch-22 as the aircraft that a pilot commits suicide in after accidentally killing another squadron member with his propeller. The title of Joseph Heller's 1961 satirical novel of the same name has entered the lexicon.

Lamson Alcor
The one-of-a-kind Lamson L-106 Alcor pressurized high-altitude research sailplane played a key role in the 1977 book Sierra Sierra, by John Joss. In the novel, Marine fighter pilot Mark Lewis saw his best friend, John O'Halloran, killed on the last day of the Vietnam War. When he travels to Seattle, Washington, to explain O'Halloran's death to his family he discovers that O'Halloran's father and sister are engaged in building a research glider, the Alcor, in which O'Halloran was to have set world records for altitude and distance, when he returned from Vietnam. Instead Lewis takes O'Halloran's place in the project, while trying to put his own life back together after the war, flying the Alcor in the mountain wave of the Sierra Nevada.

Lockheed Constellation
Lockheed Constellations of Trans World Airlines were depicted in the 2004 Martin Scorsese film The Aviator. The preserved Super Constellation, "Star of America", N6937C, of the Airline History Museum was filmed at San Bernardino International Airport, California, for this Howard Hughes biopic. A fleet of grounded Connies was rendered in CGI.

The same aircraft (N6937C) was also used in the 1992 film Voyager which starred Sam Shepard and was directed by Volker Schlöndorff.

Lockheed C-141 Starlifter

In Jimmie H. Butler's 1991 novel Red Lightning, Black Thunder, the US deploys a Lockheed C-141 Starlifter out of Hawaii in a mission to launch ASAT missiles against a Soviet network of killer satellites.

Lockheed P-3 Orion
The Hainan Island incident was referenced in the television series JAG, in the 2001 episode "Dog Robber" during season 7. In this episode based on the real incident, a US Navy Lockheed EP-3 Orion collides in mid-air with a Chinese fighter. The EP-3 crew then make an emergency landing at Fuzhou air base in China. The crew and aircraft are detained as in the real incident. A US delegation led by Admiral Thomas Boone flies to the base and secures the release of the crew, but the aircraft remains in Chinese custody. Against orders a Navy Lieutenant flies into Chinese airspace and destroys the EP-3 before the Chinese have a chance to study it in detail. This leads to him being court-martialed.

Lockheed P-80/F-80 Shooting Star
Lockheed F-80 Shooting Stars appear in the 1953 novel Troubling of a Star by Walt Sheldon which portrayed a USAF unit stationed in occupied Japan during the Korean War.

Lockheed Model 12 Electra Junior
A Lockheed Model 12 Electra Junior, registration NC17342 appears in the 1940 film Flight Angels as an experimental aircraft called the "Stratosphere". This particular aircraft also appears in the films Rosalie, Nick Carter, Master Detective, Secret Service of the Air, and Murder Over New York.

A Model 12 Electra Junior appeared as the French airliner in the climactic final scene from the 1942 film Casablanca. (The aircraft carries the Air France seahorse logo, although Air France did not operate the type.) A "cut-out" stood in for a real aircraft in many shots.

A pair of restored Lockheed Model 12 Electra Juniors was used in the filming of the 2009 movie Amelia, a biopic of aviator Amelia Earhart which starred Hilary Swank and Richard Gere. One of the aircraft was repainted to resemble a Lockheed Model 10 which was the aircraft in which Earhart and her navigator Fred Noonan were flying when they disappeared in 1937. The owner and restorer of the latter aircraft, pilot Joe Sheppard, flew the plane during filming and he had to shave off his moustache and wear a wig to resemble Swank.

Lockheed Hudson
Lockheed Hudsons appeared in the films A Yank in the R.A.F. (1941) and Captains of the Clouds (1942)

A vintage flying Lockheed Hudson IV appeared in the 2005 Second World War film The Great Raid directed by John Dahl. The film was based on the book by William Breuer. The Hudson now resides in the Temora Aviation Museum in Australia.

Lockheed Hudsons appeared in the 2006 Canadian Broadcasting Corporation (CBC) mini-series Above and Beyond which portrayed the work of the Atlantic Ferry Organisation in flying military aircraft across the North Atlantic from Canada to deliver them to the RAF in Great Britain during the Second World War. An actual Hudson appeared in the series along with a number of others recreated with CGI.

Lockheed JetStar
Auric Goldfinger's private aircraft in the 1964 James Bond film Goldfinger is a Lockheed L-1329 JetStar with "Auric Enterprises" on the nose. A similar version designated C-140 in US military service appears without markings as a U.S. Military Air Transport Service plane to transport Bond to Washington to meet the US president before the film's climactic showdown between Bond and Goldfinger.

The demise of a Lockheed JetStar and its passengers features prominently in the opening chapters of Cormac McCarthy's 2022 novel The Passenger, forming a plot point around which the majority of the book revolves.

Lockheed L-1011 TriStar
Several Lockheed L-1011 TriStars were depicted in the 1990 action film Die Hard 2, with two large models constructed by Industrial Light and Magic "flown" on wires for the cameras through "storm clouds" made of non-toxic vaporized mineral oil. Filming was done at a remote airstrip in the Mojave Desert in California. Whipped by the Santa Ana winds coming through the Tehachapi Pass into the valley, the smoke effect contributed convincing heavy weather to the shots.

The Lockheed L-1011 Tristar appears in the 1992 film Passenger 57 as the location of a terrorist hijacking. The aircraft, registration N330EA, was formerly operated commercially by Eastern Airlines and was painted in the livery of the fictional airline Atlantic International for the film.

An L-1011 is used in the Stephen King TV miniseries the Langoliers. Registration N31018, c/n 193B-1065 built in 1974. Formerly of TWA-Trans World Airlines.

In Final Approach terrorists take over an L-1011, the actual plane being N140SC currently operated as Stargazer.

Although a Boeing 777 is mentioned as aircraft for the ill-fated Oceanic Airlines Flight 815 central to the ABC television series Lost, the fuselage used to represent the wreckage on the beach was a Lockheed L-1011-385 formerly operated by Delta Air Lines.Ryan, Tim. "The 'Lost' aircraft made 28,822 flights before its 'crash. Honolulu Star-Bulletin, 14 June 2005.

Lockheed SR-71 Blackbird
In the 1985 film D.A.R.Y.L. the protagonist steals an SR-71 Blackbird from an air base while trying to escape from government agents.

In Payne Harrison's 1990 novel Storming Intrepid, the US deploys an SR-71 over the USSR on an ELINT mission to record communications between the hijacked shuttle Intrepid and Soviet commanders on the ground. The Soviet air defenses attempt to shoot down the aircraft as it tries to get out of Soviet airspace. The aircraft briefly flames out, but successfully recovers and narrowly escapes a missile trap by MiG-31 interceptors.

Although already retired from service for around a decade at the time of the film's release, the SR-71 Blackbird appears as the alt-mode of the character Jetfire, an over-the-hill Transformer near the end of his days, in the 2009 film Transformers: Revenge of the Fallen and its toy line.

Lockheed T-33 T-Bird
A Lockheed T-33, the trainer version of the Lockheed F-80 Shooting Star, appeared in the 1955 science-fiction film This Island Earth. In one of the early scenes of the film, the hero scientist Cal (played by Rex Reason) is about to land his T-33 at the desert airfield near his government-owned laboratory when the aircraft becomes ensnared by some unknown alien force. The film achieved renewed fame when it was spoofed in the 1996 comedy Mystery Science Theater 3000: The Movie.

A T-33 played the role of a Soviet "Yak-12" in the 1957 Cold War romantic/drama Jet Pilot which starred John Wayne and Janet Leigh and was directed by Howard Hughes.

Lockheed U-2

In 2015, Steven Spielberg's film Bridge of Spies recreated the 1960 events of a Lockheed U-2 piloted by Francis Gary Powers being shot down while on a reconnaissance mission over the Soviet Union.

The U-2 made an important appearance in the 2000 Beacon Pictures docudrama Thirteen Days as the aircraft that initially detected Soviet missiles being deployed in Cuba in October 1962, and was later shot down, killing pilot Maj. Rudolf Anderson, Jr. (played by Chip Esten), the only combat casualty of the Cuban Missile Crisis.

In the 1980s television series Call to Glory, the U-2 was the "main ride" of U.S. Air Force Colonel Raynor Sarnac from the October 1962 Cuba Crisis to 1979.

Lockheed Vega
A Lockheed Vega DL-1B Special, one of only two that remain in flying condition, was used in the 1976 television miniseries Amelia Earhart, starring Susan Clark as the aviatrix.

A Stinson Reliant stood in for Lockheed Vega DL-1 Special, G-ABGK, c/n 155, "Puck", race number 36, in the 1991 Australian mini-series The Great Air Race, about the 1934 London to Melbourne MacRobertson Trophy Air Race. It is also known as Half a World Away.

Martin MB-2
The 1927 William Wellman film Wings featured Martin MB-2s among many types depicting World War I aircraft.

 McDonnell Douglas DC-10 

In Michael Crichton's Airframe, one of the characters uses the crash of American Airlines Flight 191 which involved a DC-10 to describe how a highly publicized accident can destroy a good airplane's reputation because "a media industry that has grown hostile and shallow with the ascendancy of television always jumps to the wrong conclusion."

 MBB Bo 105 
James Bond fights the crew of the MBB Bo 105 helicopter as it flies over Mexico City's Day of the Dead parade in the 2015 film SpectreMesserschmitt Bf 108

Two Messerschmitt Bf 108 Taifuns depicted Messerschmitt Bf 109 fighters in the 1962 film The Longest Day, and the type substituted for unavailable Luftwaffe fighters again in the 1964 film 633 Squadron.

Messerschmitt Bf 109
27 Spanish Hispano Aviación HA-1112 M1L 'Buchon' single-engined fighters, Messerschmitt Bf 109s built under license in Spain, were used in the 1969 film Battle of Britain. The Buchons were altered to look more like correct Bf 109Es, adding mock machine guns and cannon, redundant tailplane struts, and removing the rounded wingtips.

Computer-generated images of Bf 109Gs appear in the 2012 Second World War aerial film Red Tails directed by Anthony Hemingway and produced by Lucasfilm.

A computer-generated Bf 109 also appears in the 2002 war film Hart's War which starred Colin Farrell and Bruce Willis and was based on the 1999 novel of the same name by John Katzenbach. In the film, a Bf 109 engages in a dogfight with a P-51 above the POW camp where the film is set and the former is shot down, crashing into one of the camp's guard-posts.

Messerschmitt Bf 110
A Messerschmitt Bf 110 appears in the 1952 British war film Angels One Five. In the film, the Luftwaffe raids 'Pimpernel' Squadron's airfield at Neethly. During the attack, Pilot Officer 'Septic' Baird (John Gregson), although not yet an operational pilot, runs to a spare Hawker Hurricane fighter and takes off. He engages and shoots down a Bf-110 over the airfield and is later seen proudly inspecting the crashed aircraft although Baird is later reprimanded by his CO because during the battle, he carelessly left his radio stuck on 'transmit', preventing other pilots from communicating. The Messerschmitt used in the film was a captured Bf-110G-4 which was later scrapped after filming.

Messerschmitt Me 262

The American hard rock band Blue Öyster Cult portrayed a Messerschmitt Me 262A on the cover of their third album Secret Treaties (1974). The album also contains a song, "Me 262", written from the point of view of a Luftwaffe pilot on a bomber interception mission in April 1945.

In the 2000 alternate history novel Fox on the Rhine, by Douglas Niles and Michael Dobson, the Luftwaffe, under Adolf Galland's command, prioritizes the development of the Me 262. A number of squadrons are used to maul a heavy bomber raid in concert with other, propeller-driven, fighters, but worker sabotage of the engines affects their operational performance.

In the second and last issue of the 2001 DC Vertigo miniseries Enemy Ace: War in Heaven, lead character Hans von Hammer leads a Luftwaffe flight against USAAF bomber formations with him piloting a scarlet red Me 262 that has no swastika tail insignia. Seeing the hopelessness of the war, he and his men later destroy the remaining 262s in their control before surrendering to a US Army unit.

MiGs (generic)
As was common in the 1950s, "MiGs" (presumably MiG−15s, as the story is set in Korea) appear in the 1956 novel The Hunters by James Salter about USAF fighter pilots. As was common in the 1950s, the MiGs are portrayed by Republic F-84F Thunderstreaks in the 1958 film The HuntersMiGs were also played on screen by the F-5 Tiger II in 1986's Top Gun  and the 1998 JAG episode 3.24.

MiGs appear in the 2007 novel Ascent by UK author Jed Mercurio, a fictional work about a Soviet pilot Yefgeni Yeremin covertly flying MiGs during the Korean War. The book was later adapted into a graphic novel in 2011, illustrated by Wesley Robins.

Mikoyan-Gurevich MiG-15
A flyable MiG-15 is to appear in the 2022 Korean War drama film Devotion.

Mikoyan-Gurevich MiG-21
The Indian (Hindi) films Silsila (1981), Border and Rang De Basanti (2006) depicted the Mikoyan-Gurevich MiG-21.

Mikoyan MiG-29
The Mikoyan MiG-29 is the alternate form of the figure Dreadwing as well as its redecos Overcast and Fearswoop from the 2007 and 2009 Transformers film toy lines.

Mil Mi-8/-17
A Mil Mi-17 is used in the 2001 film Behind Enemy Lines as a NATO combat search and rescue (CSAR) helicopter that makes an attempt to rescue a downed airman.

At the beginning of the 2002 film Die Another Day, a Mil Mi-8T is commandeered by James Bond, to infiltrate the antagonists' base.

The aircraft also appeared in the 2006 film Blood Diamond, directed by Edward Zwick; it was used by the protagonist to reach a refugee camp.

An Mil Mi-8 helicopter appears in a major sequence in the 2019 Netflix film Triple Frontier directed by J C Chandor and starring Ben Affleck.

Mi-8s appear in the 2019 HBO mini-series Chernobyl. Mi-8s were among the Soviet helicopters used to firefight and monitor the exploded reactor in 1986. In the series, helicopters are seen dropping sand-bags onto the fire and one helicopter is destroyed in a crash. The series portrays the incident as taking place shortly after the initial explosion at the reactor but in reality, the crash occurred some weeks later.

Mil Mi-24 'Hind'

A Mil Mi-24 helicopter appears in the 1997 film Air Force One. The aircraft is used to retrieve a Russian prisoner in exchange for the US President, who is being held captive.

The Mi-24 appears numerous times in the Metal Gear video game series, starting from the 1987 MSX original. Its appearance as a boss battle in the 1998 game Metal Gear Solid is probably the most famous instance.

The helicopter is used extensively in the 2005 film The 9th Company, which fictionally depicts the Battle for Hill 3234 where Soviet Army paratroopers defend their post against Mujahideen fighters. It was especially employed to eliminate the Mujahideen's last wave of attack in the film's climactic battle.

In the 2006 film Blood Diamond, a Mi-24 is employed to attack a rebel village.

The 2007 film Charlie Wilson's War portrays the Mi-24 as used in the Soviet–Afghan War. Mujahideen use FIM-92 Stinger missiles supplied through US Congressman Charlie Wilson's efforts to shoot down Soviet Mi-24s.

The helicopter is used by the antagonist to flee a Moscow rooftop in the 2013 film A Good Day to Die Hard.

In the 2022 film Top Gun: Maverick, a Mi-24 is used by the enemy in an attempt to kill Pete "Maverick" Mitchell after his aircraft was shot down, only for the hostile Mi-24 to be shot down by Bradley "Rooster" Bradshaw.

Mil Mi-26
In the 2013 Bruce Willis action film A Good Day to Die Hard, a Mil Mi-26T, leased from the Belarus Ministry for Emergency Situations and painted in washable military camouflage, was used in various scenes.

Miles Falcon
For the 1991 Australian mini-series The Great Air Race, about the 1934 London to Melbourne MacRobertson Trophy Air Race, also known as Half a World Away, Miles Falcon, VH-AAT, played Miles M.3 Falcon, G-ACTM, the prototype fitted with extra fuel tanks, race number 31.

Mitsubishi A5M
The Mitsubishi A5M Type 96 fighter, known to the Allies as the "Claude"", features prominently in the 2013 Studio Ghibli animated feature The Wind Rises directed by Hayao Miyazaki. The film is a semi-fictionalised lyrical portrayal of the famous Japanese aircraft designer Jiro Horikoshi and depicts him designing the A5M in the 1930s.

Moller M400 Skycar
The Moller M400 Skycar appears in the 2010 telemovie The Jensen Project with LeVar Burton and Kellie Martin. It also appears in Clive Cussler's novel Atlantis Found, where it is flown by Dirk Pitt.

Morane-Saulnier MS.230
The Morane-Saulnier MS.230 appears as the fictional "new monoplane" in the 1966 World War I epic The Blue Max and was the aircraft in which the central character Bruno Stachel (George Peppard) meets his demise. Peppard purchased the aircraft and took it back to the US where it joined the collection of the San Diego Aerospace Museum. The plot, which has Stachel wringing-out a new design until it sheds its wings, is based on the experience with the late-war Fokker E.V, a parasol design, three of six of which crashed within a week of being delivered to Jasta 6 in August 1918. Grounded for investigation, the problem was traced to shoddy workmanship at the Mecklenburg factory where defective wood spars, water damage to glued parts, and pins carelessly splintering the members instead of securing them were discovered. Upon return to service two months later, the design was renamed the Fokker D.VIII in an effort to avoid the type's reputation as a killer.

N3N Canary
Naval Aircraft Factory N3N Canarys were shown in the 1941 Warner Bros. film Dive Bomber.

Nakajima Ki-27

Nakajima Ki-27s, lifted from Japanese film, appeared in the 1942 Republic film Flying Tigers.

Nakajima Ki-43
A replica of a Nakajima Ki-43 Hayabusa appeared in the 2007 Japanese motion picture For Those We Love, a drama about WW2 Kamikaze pilots.

Nieuport 17
The Nieuport 17 was one of the main aircraft in the 2006 film Flyboys.

Nieuport 28
An authentic Nieuport 28 was provided and flown by Frank Tallman, a Hollywood film pilot, for The Twilight Zone episode "The Last Flight" in which a World War I Royal Flying Corps pilot is transported in time in a cloud to the 1960s. Norton Air Force Base, California, was the filming site. The episode first aired on 5 February 1960.

Noorduyn AT-16
Canadian-built variants of the North American T-6 Texan are seen in the 1943 RKO film Bombardier, filmed at Kirtland Field, New Mexico.

Noorduyn Norseman
The Noorduyn Norseman appears in scenes in the 1942 Warner Bros. film Captains of the Clouds, with Jimmy Cagney as a Canadian bush pilot at the start of World War II.

North American AT-6 Texan
The 1941 Paramount Pictures film I Wanted Wings featured flights of more than 50 North American T-6 Texans from Kelly Field, Texas.

An SNJ-5 Texan, a naval variant of the AT-6, appeared in several television productions. It was modified to play the role of a Japanese Zero in the TV series Baa Baa Black Sheep (1977) and the mini-series Pearl (1979) and it played the roles of both a Zero and an SBD Dauntless in the 1987 mini-series War and Remembrance. T-6 Texans, one piloted by World War Two Marine Ace Archie Donaue represented Japanese Zeroes in the 1980 science fiction film The Final Countdown (film)

North American Harvards, the British Commonwealth name for the AT-6, appear prominently in Captains of the Clouds, starring James Cagney.

North American BT-9 / BT-16
North American BT-9 and BT-16 basic trainers were filmed at Randolph Field, Texas, for the 1941 Paramount Pictures film I Wanted Wings, based on the 1937 novel of the same title by 1st Lt. Beirne Lay, Jr.

North American X-15

On 5 November 1959, a small engine fire forced pilot Scott Crossfield to make an emergency landing on Rosamond Dry Lake, Edwards Air Force Base, California, in a North American X-15. Not designed to land with fuel on board, the X-15 landed with a heavy load of propellants and broke its back, grounding it for three months. Footage of this accident was later incorporated in The Outer Limits episode "The Premonition", first aired 9 January 1965.

The rocket craft is also the subject of the 1961 Essex Productions film X-15, a fictionalized account of the program, directed by Richard Donner in his first outing, and narrated by USAF Brigadier General (Reserve) James Stewart in an uncredited role.

In the opening scene of the 2018 film First Man, Neil Armstrong, played by Ryan Gosling, is seen piloting a North American X-15 during a test flight.

Northrop A-17
The Northrop A-17 makes an appearance at March Field at the conclusion of the 1941 Paramount Pictures film I Wanted Wings.

 Northrop M2-F2 
The Northrop M2-F2, a NASA research aircraft, appears in the 1970s TV series The Six Million Dollar Man, starring Lee Majors. In the first episode, protagonist Steve Austin crashes the aircraft during a test flight and is severely injured. The footage used was from a real M2-F2 accident that took place on 10 May 1967 in the California desert. The clip of the crash was also used in the opening titles of each episode. The opening titles also used footage of the later Northrop HL-10 aircraft.

Northrop YB-49
Paramount Pictures' 1953 film, The War of the Worlds incorporates color footage of a Northrop YB-49 test flight, originally used in one of Paramount's Popular Science theatrical shorts. In the George Pal film, the Flying Wing is used to drop an atomic bomb on the invading Martians.

 Northrop Grumman E-2 Hawkeye 
In the film The Final Countdown (1980) a Grumman E-2 Hawkeye is used by the USS Nimitz as an airborne command and radar facility to track the Japanese Fleet heading to attack Pearl Harbour.

In the 2022 film Top Gun: Maverick, the E-2 plays an important role in the topical air attack operation, conducting the strike pack (consisting of four F-18) and detecting enemy aircraft.

O-1 Bird Dog
The 1990 film Air America, which loosely recounted the exploits of the Central Intelligence Agency proprietary airline in Southeast Asia in the 1960s and early 1970s, featured Cessna O-1 Bird Dogs.

O2C Helldiver
United States Navy Curtiss O2C-2 Helldivers from Floyd Bennett Field were used in filming King Kong in 1933, but as Carl Denham observed, "Oh no, it wasn't the airplanes. It was beauty killed the beast." Writer and director Merian C. Cooper portrayed the pilot who kills Kong, while director Ernest B. Schoedsack plays his gunner, in uncredited roles. In the 2005 remake of the film, director Peter Jackson plays one of the gunners while the pilot is portrayed by Rick Baker, who played Kong (in a rubber suit) in the 1976 remake.

P-1 Hawk
The 1927 William Wellman film Wings featured Curtiss P-1 Hawks among many types depicting World War I aircraft. The P-1s were used to portray German Albatros D.V fighters.

P-35
A civilianized Seversky P-35, the Seversky S2, which won the 1937 Bendix Trophy race, appeared as the "Drake Bullet" in the 1938 MGM film Test Pilot.

P-38 LightningA Guy Named Joe (1943) has Spencer Tracy returning as a guiding spirit looking after young Lockheed P-38 Lightning pilot Van Johnson.

The 1944 short feature P-38 Reconnaissance Pilot, starring William Holden as Lt. "Packy" Cummings, dramatises the work of photo reconnaissance pilots in World War II.

The 1965 film Von Ryan's Express begins with main protagonist, USAAF Colonel Joseph Ryan (Frank Sinatra), crash landing a P-38 Lightning in World War II Italy and being held as a prisoner of war.

P-38s appear in the 1968 novel Order of Battle by Alfred Coppel, a work that portrays US P-38Fs in the fighter-bomber role over Europe in WW2.

In the 1992 action film Aces: Iron Eagle III, the main character, Brig. Gen. Chappy Sinclair (Louis Gossett Jr.), pilots a P-38J as part a mission to field old Second World War airshow aircraft against a drug cartel in Peru. The aircraft, registration N38BP, came from the Planes of Fame museum.

The CAPCOM game 1942 for the arcades and the Nintendo Entertainment System features the P-38 as the default plane of choice.

P-40 Warhawk

In the 1942 John Wayne film Flying Tigers, real Curtiss P-40 Warhawks are featured. The New York Times critic called the P-40s "the true stars" of the film. Republic Studios also built replicas for the film due to material shortages during the war. These can be identified by the fairings hiding the cylinder heads of the automotive V-8 engines installed in them, and the lack of elevators on the horizontal stabilizer.

Future US President Ronald Reagan appears in the Recognition of the Japanese Zero Fighter (training film, 1942) as a young pilot learning to recognize the difference between a P-40 and a Japanese Zero. In this film Reagan mistakes a friend's P-40 for a Japanese Zero and tries to shoot it down. In the end, Reagan gets a chance to shoot down a real Zero.

A P-40 featured in the 1973 made-for-TV film Death Race (also known as State of Division) which starred Lloyd Bridges and Doug McClure. The film featured a damaged Allied fighter, unable to take off but still able to taxi, being pursued across North Africa by a German tank.

P-47 Thunderbolt
Steve Earle's 1988 song "Johnny Come Lately" from the album Copperhead Road is about an American P-47 pilot in World War II; it contains a verse "My P-47 is a pretty good ship. She took a round comin' cross the channel last trip."

Modified T-6 Texans depicted P-47s in the 1977 film A Bridge Too Far.

P-51 Mustang
P-51 Mustangs featured in the 1948 Warner Bros. film Fighter Squadron which was directed by Raoul Walsh and starred Edmond O'Brien & Robert Stack. In this film, P-51Ds belonging to the California Air National Guard played the role of German Bf-109 fighters to which the P-51 bore some resemblance from certain angles. For the production, P-51s were coated with acrylic Luftwaffe paint-schemes. The aerial sequences were filmed near Van Nuys in Los Angeles, California.

A P-51 Mustang piloted by Jimmy Leeward features as an antagonist in the 1980 aerobatics movie Cloud Dancer.

The Steven Spielberg film Empire of the Sun (1987), based on the J. G. Ballard novel of the same name, featured models and restored Mustangs in an attack on a Japanese airstrip next to the internment camp where the story's protagonist is imprisoned. This was the most complex and elaborately staged sequence of the film, requiring over 10 days of filming and 60 hours of aerial footage of Mustangs. Film historians and reviewers regard the scene as a significant cinematic achievement: "Spielberg's most emotionally reverberant moment, and one of the rare movie scenes that can truly be called epiphanies."

In the 1998 film Saving Private Ryan, a flight of P-51s save embattled American troops from German ground forces.

Red-Tailed P-51s play a central role in the 2012 film Red Tails when the 332nd Fighter Group is assigned to bomber escort duties, finally replacing their aging P-40s.

Panavia Tornado
The Transformers character Darkwing disguises itself as a Panavia Tornado.

The Royal Air Force's ground attack aircraft, the Panavia Tornado, featured extensively in the television pilot Strike Force, produced in the 1990s for ITV in the UK. Strike Force did not enter series production.

RAF Tornadoes featured in the 1998 BBC science fiction TV mini-series Invasion Earth written & co-produced by Jed Mercurio. In the series, Tornado jets are scrambled to intercept a UFO.

The Tornado was the subject of the 1985 video game Tornado Low Level, in which the titular aircraft was used to destroy enemy target markers. The markers could only be destroyed when the Tornado's wings were fully swept back, and moving at full speed.

PBY Catalina
A PBY Catalina features in the 1947 film High Barbaree (also released under the title Enchanted Island) which was directed by Jack Conway, starred Van Johnson and was based on the 1945 novel of the same name by Charles Nordhoff & James Norman Hall. The film portrays a PBY crew during WW2 in the Pacific. During a depth-charge attack on a Japanese submarine, the PBY is damaged and crash-lands in enemy waters, leaving only two survivors, pilot Lt. Brooke (Johnson) and navigator Lt. Moore (Cameron Mitchell).

A former Royal Danish Air Force PBY-6A Catalina appeared in the 1976 film Midway.

A PBY-5A Catalina appeared in the opening sequence of the 1989 Steven Spielberg film Always as a firebomber picking up a water load and bearing down on two startled fishermen.

PB4Y Privateer
United States Navy PB4Y-2M Privateers of VP-23, based at Naval Air Station Miami, Florida, were filmed at the close of the 1948 hurricane season and the footage used in the 1949 20th Century-Fox film Slattery's Hurricane.

Percival Proctor

The most prominent of the real aircraft in Nevil Shute's 1951 novel Round the Bend is a war-surplus Percival Proctor, which is used by the protagonist Constantine Shak Lin (also known as Connie Shaklin) to tour Asia to spread his teachings. At the end of the book the Proctor is the basis of a shrine to Shaklin and his new creed, laid up in a hangar in a state of uncompleted maintenance for pilgrims to view.

In 1968, three Proctors were remodelled with inverted gull wings and other cosmetic alterations to represent Junkers Ju 87s in the film Battle of Britain but, in the event, radio-controlled models were used instead.

Pfalz D.III
A pair of flying replica Pfalz D.IIIs were constructed to appear in the 1966 epic First World War film The Blue Max, based on the novel of the same name by Jack D. Hunter. The aircraft subsequently appeared in Darling Lili (1970) and Von Richthofen & Brown (1971).

Pfalz D.XII
A Pfalz D.XII which is now in the National Air and Space Museum, Washington, D.C., was flown in The Dawn Patrol (1930), Hell's Angels (1930), and Men with Wings (1938). Footage of the Pfalz from The Dawn Patrol also featured in the 1938 remake with Errol Flynn.

Pilatus Porter/Fairchild AU-23
The STOL-capable Pilatus PC-6 Porter was depicted in the 1990 film Air America, loosely recounting the exploits of the Central Intelligence Agency proprietary airline in Southeast Asia in the 1960s and early 1970s. The PC-6s in this film were actually Fairchild AU-23A Peacemakers, the US-built version of the aircraft. Five examples were used in the production, four of them belonging to the Royal Thai Air-Force and a fifth which was a hybrid re-constructed from a number of derelict Porters. The latter was used for the filming of a landing on a hill-top airstrip because the Thai Air-Force refused to risk one of their own Porters in the filming of that scene.

A Pilatus PC-6 Porter was used for the first jump and training scenes in the 1994 film Drop Zone.

Piper Cherokee
The character Pussy Galore in the 1964 James Bond film Goldfinger is the leader of "Pussy Galore's Flying Circus", a group of women who fly Piper Cherokees, trained acrobats turned cat burglars, in the novel of the same name by Ian Fleming. In the film the arch-villain uses the Cherokees in his plan to deprive the US government of the gold in Fort Knox.

Piper PA-28 Warrior
Mark Haddon's 2019 novel The Porpoise starts with the flight en route to Popham Airfield in Hampshire and subsequent crash of a Piper PA-28 Warrior caused when the pilot crashes into a silo between Gapennes and Yvrench in Somme department resulting in four deaths including a pregnant woman, the only survivor being an unborn baby saved by a passing doctor. The baby becomes the protagonist of the novel.

Pitts Special
Pitts Special S-1S and S-2A airplanes feature prominently in the 1980 film Cloud Dancer, which flying scenes were filmed with cameras adapted to resist up to 12 g, mounted on the planes. The story follows a competition aerobatics champion through his show season, starring David Carradine. The role of Curtis Pitts was played by Woodrow Chambliss in a short scene; the movie had the participation both in performance as in advice of pilots Tom Poberezny, Charlie Hillard, Leo Loudenslager, and Jimmy Leeward. The movie is dedicated to pilot Walt Tubb, who died a few months after the filming, coincidentally while doing the same maneuver that in the movie causes the death of one of the characters.

RAH-66 Comanche
The cancelled Boeing-Sikorsky RAH-66 Comanche appeared in director Ang Lee's Hulk film in 2003.

The 1993 shooter game Jungle Strike has the main character flying the RAH-66 Comanche to complete various missions.

 Republic RC-3 Seabee 
The Republic RC-3 Seabee is an amphibious aircraft which James Bond uses in the 1974 film The Man With the Golden Gun, to get to the island lair of villain Francisco Scaramanga. Bond lands the plane at the island, but it is later destroyed by Scaramanga's solar-powered laser gun.

 RF-8 Crusader 
The RF-8 is a reconnaissance version of the Vought F-8 Crusader carrier-based air superiority aircraft. In the 1980 film The Final Countdown an RF-8 is used by the USS Nimitz to overfly the Pearl Harbor naval base. The photos taken during that mission of the US Navy Fleet prior to the 1941 Japanese attack, convince the Nimitz's commanders that somehow they have gone back in time from the 1980s to the 1940s.

Royal Aircraft Factory B.E.2

A replica Royal Aircraft Factory B.E.2c was used in the production of the BBC Great War drama series Wings which aired in 1977–1978. The replica was originally commissioned in 1969 by Universal Studios for a proposed big-budget film Biggles Sweeps the Skies but the project was cancelled after the aircraft was built. The replica was constructed by engineer and pilot Charles Boddington who was later killed during the making of the 1971 film Von Richthofen & Brown. His son Matthew recently rebuilt the aircraft (after it was badly damaged in an accidental crash in the US) and it flew again at Sywell aerodrome, UK, in 2011.

Royal Aircraft Factory S.E.5
The 1927 William Wellman film Wings featured a Royal Aircraft Factory S.E.5a among many types depicting World War I aircraft.

Ryan NYP
The 1938 Paramount film Men with Wings, starring Ray Milland, featured a reproduction of the Spirit of St. Louis fashioned from a Ryan B-1 Brougham.

A recreation of the Ryan NYP was used for the 1957 Warner Bros. film The Spirit of St. Louis, starring Jimmy Stewart as Charles Lindbergh.

Saab JAS 39 Gripen
In the 2017 film Transformers: The Last Knight the Decepticon Nitro Zeus transforms into a Saab JAS 39 Gripen.

In the 2019 anime series Girly Air Force, Gripen is one of the main fighter aircraft featured in the series along with Kei Narutani, the main protagonist of the series.

SBD Dauntless
A Douglas SBD Dauntless was used in the production of the 1976 motion picture Midway. An SBD-5, which had formerly served in the RNZAF and which was (in 1976) non-airworthy and wingless, was used in the filming of the cockpit close-ups for actors such as Charlton Heston.

Later in 1987, the same aircraft (BuNo 28536), now in airworthy condition, was used in the production of the epic 1988–1989 TV mini-series War & Remembrance. The aircraft appeared in the sequence depicting the Battle of Midway and during filming, was flown off the  the first time an SBD had taken off from a carrier in 42 years.

Douglas SBDs are a major feature in the 2019 film Midway directed by Roland Emmerich. The aircraft were recreated digitally and at least one full-scale static replica was built.

SB2C Helldiver / A-25 Shrike

Two USAAF Curtiss RA-25A Shrikes collided during a flypast for an air show near Spokane, Washington, on 23 July 1944, the accident filmed by a Paramount Pictures newsreel crew. This footage was used in the 1956 film Earth vs. the Flying Saucers, apparently being shot down by a saucer.

SB2U Vindicator
Vought SB2U Vindicators were featured in the 1941 Warner Bros. film Dive Bomber.

Short Sunderland
The Short Sunderland flying boat patrol bomber takes a key part in Ivan Southall's autobiographical 1974 novel Fly West, where the writer tells his life as a RAF Coastal Command Sunderland pilot during World War II. Many details about the aircraft looks, performance and procedures are given throughout the book, and as almost the entirety of the book is set inside Sunderlands, the warplane practically becomes a character. Other aircraft, both from Allied and German origin, are also featured and mentioned.

A Short Sunderland was the setting for much of the 1980 novel The Flying Porcupine by Richard Haligon. The novel takes its title from a nickname reputedly given to the Sunderland by German pilots thanks to its defensive armament of as many as 16 machine guns.

Sikorsky SH-3 Sea King
CIA officer Jack Ryan (played by Alec Baldwin) is flown from an aircraft carrier to the submarine  in a Sikorsky SH-3H Sea King in the 1990 film Hunt for Red October, based on the Tom Clancy's novel of the same title.

At the end of the successful rescue mission for Apollo 13, two SH-3 Sea Kings, historically painted as Helos 66 and 406, retrieve the astronauts from their spacecraft after splashdown in the 1995 Ron Howard film.

Sikorsky H-5 / R-5 / HO2S / HO3S / S-51

In the 1954 science fiction film Them!, a Sikorsky S-51 is used to spot giant ants in the New Mexico desert.

A Westland Widgeon, a UK-built version of the Sikorsky S-51, appears in the 1971 British film When Eight Bells Toll, starring Anthony Hopkins, directed by Étienne Périer and based on the Alistair MacLean novel of the same name. Aerial scenes were filmed over the Scottish islands of Staffa and Mull.

Sikorsky HO5S / S-52
A flyable Sikorsky HO5S-1 will be featured in the 2022 Korean War drama film Devotion. When the film was made, the helicopter was one of the few flyable examples remaining in the world.

Sikorsky H-19 / Westland Whirlwind
The 1955 Warner Bros. film The McConnell Story, about Capt. Joseph C. McConnell, Jr., the top American ace of the Korean War, includes footage of a Sikorsky H-19 Chickasaw rescuing a downed B-29 crew in that conflict, while under heavy fire. A Chickasaw was furnished by the 48th Air Rescue Squadron, Eglin AFB, Florida, for seven days of filming at Alexandria AFB, Louisiana, in February 1955.

The character of "Harold the Helicopter" from the British children’s book series, The Railway Series and its TV program adaptation, Thomas & Friends is based on the Sikorsky S-55, built in the UK as the Westland Whirlwind.

The Sikorsky S-55 appeared in Irwin Allen's 1960 film, The Lost World.

The book, Retreat Hell, by W. E. B. Griffin, takes place in Korea during the Korean War. It centers on the use of a Sikorsky H-19A helicopter during the fall 1950. Much of the action is driven forward by the abilities of the helicopter.

Sikorsky S-58
A Sikorsky S-58T appears as the "Screaming Mimi" in the 1980s television series Riptide. This S-58 is still in service as a heavy lift helicopter.

Sikorsky H-53 series
A HH-53B Sea Stallion appears in the 1974 film Airport 1975, where a pilot is lowered on a tether from the helicopter to a damaged Boeing 747 in flight.

The HH-53C variant was used in the combined combat search and rescue and VIP delivery sequences in the 1982 Malpaso Productions spy and action film Firefox, produced, directed by, and starring Clint Eastwood, based on the 1977 novel of the same name by Craig Thomas.

The Sikorsky CH-53E Super Stallion appears in the 2002 film The Sum of All Fears, based on the Tom Clancy novel of the same title.

A CH-53E Super Stallion is featured in the 1997 film The Jackal, where it flies over Washington D.C. and hovers between buildings during a fast rope sequence.

The Sikorsky MH-53J is featured in the 2007 Transformers film as the alternate mode of Blackout. Production designer Jeff Mann stated "the Pave Low looks butch ... the size made it the logical choice." Toys for Blackout were MH-53 replicas, which were reused for the characters of Evac, Spinister and Whirl.

The heavier CH-53E Super Stallion is the alternate form for the Decepticon Grindor in the 2009 film Transformers: Revenge of the Fallen.

The Sikorsky MH-53 appears in the 2009 video game Call of Duty: Modern Warfare 2, referred to simply as the "Pave Low".

Sikorsky CH-54 Tarhe/Sikorsky S-64
In the 1996 film Independence Day a Sikorsky S-64 Skycrane is fitted with an array of flashing lights to communicate with an alien spaceship.

A Skycrane also appears in the 2001 film Swordfish, near the climactic ending in which it has a bus full of hostages slung loaded underneath, and is flying through downtown Los Angeles.

Sikorsky H-60 series
In the 1994 film Clear and Present Danger, a pair of MH-60K Black Hawks are used to insert a special ops team into a Colombian jungle.

Black Hawks were also featured in the 1997 film Air Force One, having been rented from the US military.

The Sikorsky UH-60 Black Hawk was the title aircraft in the 2001 film Black Hawk Down. For this film too the film makers rented the aircraft, paying the US Department of Defense about $3 million to ship eight helicopters and about 100 crew members to the film location in Morocco.

In the 2003 film Tears of the Sun three SH-60 Seahawk helicopters bring evacuated US embassy staff and their SEAL team rescuers from Nigeria to the aircraft carrier USS Harry S. Truman. Two SH-60 Seahawk helicopters are used to retrieve a SEAL team and refugees in Nigeria.

Sikorsky S-29-A
Igor Sikorsky's Sikorsky S-29-A, previously owned by Roscoe Turner, doubled for a Gotha bomber in Howard Hughes' 1930 aerial epic Hell's Angels. It was destroyed during filming. At the time of the aircraft's demise it had flown 500,000 miles.

Sikorsky S-38
Replicas of the Sikorsky S-38 were used in the filming of the 2004 Martin Scorsese biopic of Howard Hughes, The Aviator.

Sikorsky VS-44
When MGM produced the 1959 film The Gallant Hours, based on the life of US Navy Admiral William "Bull" Halsey, the studio rented a Sikorsky VS-44A, N41881, named "Mother Goose", from Catalina Air Lines, Inc., and painted it in wartime camouflage to depict a secret flight that Halsey had made to the South Pacific in a Consolidated PB2Y-1 Coronado. Although the studio had promised to repaint the flying boat after the production, this did not happen, and the airline had to restore the civilian livery itself.

Sopwith Camel

The First World War Sopwith Camel fighter features prominently in the Biggles stories of W. E. Johns such as the collections: The Camels Are Coming (1932), and Biggles of the Camel Squadron (1934).

The 1934 novel Winged Victory by Victor M. Yeates features the Sopwith Camel in action during the Great War.

Sopwith Camels appear in the 2013 novel A Splendid Little War by Derek Robinson which depicts a fictional RAF unit – Merlin Squadron – flying Camels in support of the White forces during the Russian Civil War in 1919.

Sopwith 1½ Strutter
A 1/6 scale radio-controlled model of a Sopwith 1½ Strutter was constructed by Proctor Enterprises to appear in the ABC television series The Young Indiana Jones Chronicles episode "Attack of the Hawkmen" (1995) produced by George Lucas.

A replica Sopwith 1½ Strutter featured in the 2006 film Flyboys, a drama about the Lafayette Escadrille. The replica, built in 1992, was purchased from a private museum in Alabama.

Sopwith Pup
The fictional RFC squadron in Derek Robinson's 1999 First World War novel Hornet's Sting flies the Sopwith Pup.

Space Shuttle orbiter
The Transformers Combaticon named Blast Off, the Autobot Sky Lynx, and triple-changer Astrotrain all disguise themselves as Space Shuttle orbiters.

In the 1979 James Bond film Moonraker the film opens with the disappearance during a routine transfer flight, on the back of a Boeing 747, of the eponymous space shuttle, built and operated by the Drax Corporation.

In Payne Harrison's 1990 novel Storming Intrepid, the shuttle Intrepid – one of four new shuttles built by the US government – is hijacked by its mission commander, who is a Russian agent. The plot revolves around American efforts to prevent the agent from landing the shuttle in the USSR with its advanced SDI system intact.

In the 2000 film Space Cowboys, four retired astronauts launch into space aboard the shuttle Daedalus to repair a crippled Russian satellite.

In Jon Amiel's 2003 film The Core, space shuttle Endeavour is sent off course by a disruption in the Earth's magnetic field, forcing it to land in the concrete-lined channel of the Los Angeles River.

In the 2013 film Gravity, space shuttle Explorer is destroyed by an out of control satellite in the early portion of the film.

SPAD
The 1927 William Wellman film Wings featured a SPAD S.VII among many types depicting World War I aircraft.

Race Bannon, flying a SPAD S.XIII, fights a dogfight with a Fokker D.VII, flown by Baron Heinrich von Frohleich in Episode 10 of Jonny Quest, "Shadow of the Condor", first aired 20 November 1964.

Stampe SV.4
The 1976 film Aces High uses several modified Stampe SV.4 aircraft made to look like Royal Flying Corps Royal Aircraft Factory S.E.5 aircraft. These were prepared by Bianchi Aviation Film Services and flown by well-known pilots including Neil Williams.

Standard J
A Standard J-1 appeared in the 1923 film The Eleventh Hour, which starred Alan Hale Sr. During the film, a J-1 attacks a submarine on the surface but the aircraft is hit by return fire from the vessel and it explodes in mid-air. To film the scene, stunt pilot Dick Kerwood was required to fly over the submarine (loaned by the US Navy) in San Diego Bay and, at about 3,000 feet, parachute out of his plane after setting the timer to explosives which would detonate ten seconds later. However the timer proved faulty and the aircraft exploded before Kerwood could bale out. He was seriously concussed but otherwise escaped injury and he managed to open his chute in time.

Stearman C3
A Stearman C3R featured in the 1958 film No Place to Land directed by Albert C. Gannaway and starring John Ireland. The film was a drama about crop-duster pilots in post-war rural California competing with each other for work.

Stinson Model A
A static replica of a Stinson Model A was featured in the 1988 Australian TV-film The Riddle of the Stinson which starred Jack Thompson. The film was a dramatisation of the true-life crash of an Australian Airlines Stinson in Queensland in 1937 which claimed the lives of 5 men and the subsequent rescue of two survivors ten days later by local Bernard O'Reilly who treked into the rainforest and found the crash-site.

Sukhoi Su-24
The Su-24 is featured in the 2021 Russian film Sky, depicting the events surrounding the Turkish shootdown of a Russian Su-24 in 2015.

Sukhoi Su-25
The Su-25 appears in the 2005 film Mirror Wars: Reflection One.

Sukhoi Su-27 and derivatives
The Sukhoi Su-27 and its derivatives have appeared in numerous fictional media. The Su-37 appears in the 2004 film Stealth, where two were destroyed by the fictional F/A-37 jets.

Su-27 variants also feature prominently in the Ace Combat video game series, often being the aircraft of choice for main antagonists. Examples include the Yellow Squadron Su-37s in Ace Combat 04: Shattered Skies, Strigon Team Su-33s in Ace Combat 6: Fires of Liberation, Andrei Markov's Su-35S in Ace Combat: Assault Horizon, Sol Squadron Su-30M2s, and Mihaly A. Shilage's Su-30SM in Ace Combat 7: Skies Unknown.

Sukhoi Su-57
The Sukhoi Su-57 appears in Top Gun: Maverick as the aircraft used by the unnamed hostile nation, and referred to by its NATO reporting name "Felon" or as “fifth-generation fighters”. Two were shot down by a stolen F-14A Tomcat flown by Maverick and Rooster, and another by a F/A-18E Super Hornet flown by Hangman.

Supermarine Spitfire

Along with the Hawker Hurricane, the Supermarine Spitfire fighter is very strongly linked to the Battle of Britain in summer 1940, where the Royal Air Force fought the German Luftwaffe over the skies of Britain for air superiority. As such it has been featured in many works of fiction related to the Battle of Britain.

The 1951 film Malta Story is about Spitfires and their pilots defending Malta in 1942.

A Spitfire IXc was one of at least two used in the production of the 1962 World War II epic film The Longest Day. The same aircraft also appeared in Von Ryan's Express (1965), Night of the Generals (1967), and Battle of Britain (1969).

The Spitfire was a central part of the 1969 Guy Hamilton-directed film Battle of Britain, a fictionalized account of the real Battle of Britain that one critic called "the definitive depiction of war in the air". The film led to an increase in the popularity of the aircraft among collectors of warbirds. According to one property dealer the appearance "did for Spitfires what the James Bond films did for the Aston Martin." Producers secured 35 Spitfires for use in the film.

The Spitfire was also the main aircraft used in the 1988 miniseries Piece of Cake. The series was based on a novel by the same name. Pilots in the novel flew the Hawker Hurricane, but the lack of airworthy Hurricanes forced the producers to change aircraft types, using five privately owned airworthy Spitfires and a collection of static and taxiing replicas.

Real-life World War II RAF ace Douglas Bader was portrayed as a night-flying Spitfire pilot during The Blitz in the animated Disney series Gargoyles second-season episode "M.I.A", and was saved from losing his life in air combat by Goliath and by Griff, a British gargoyle of the London Clan.

The 2001 Czech film Dark Blue World, a World War II drama about Czech pilots who flew with the Royal Air Force directed by Jan Svěrák, featured Spitfires. The vintage Spitfires cost the film-makers US$7,500 an hour to use. The aerial sequences were a combination of live aerial footage, CGI and out-takes from the 1969 film The Battle of Britain.

Spitfires starred in the 2006 seven-minute short film/commercial Pilots produced by the Swiss-German watch manufacturer IWC Schaffhausen to promote its Big Pilot's Watch Collection. John Malkovich featured in the film.

In the 2017 movie Dunkirk, directed by Christopher Nolan; three Spitfires were featured defending the evacuation of British and French troops from Dunkirk against attacks by the German Luftwaffe.

Supermarine Swift
The second prototype Supermarine Swift appeared as the "Prometheus" in the 1952 film The Sound Barrier.

TBD Devastator
Douglas TBDs appear in the 2019 film Midway directed by Roland Emmerich. To portray the aircraft, the producers recreated TBDs digitally and also constructed a full-scale static replica which, after filming was completed, was donated to the USS Midway Museum in San Diego. In the film, TBDs are depicted as simultaneously carrying a pair of 500-pound bombs on wing racks in addition to a torpedo, a scene which would not have happened in reality, as under-powered TBDs struggled enough with the weight of just a torpedo.

Tupolev Tu-154
A Tupolev Tu-154B was in the centre of the plot of the 1979 Soviet film Air Crew. The film is a recognized classic in Commonwealth of Independent States (CIS) countries.

UFM Easy Riser
The UFM Easy Riser was one of two ultralight aircraft that lead the Canada geese south in the 1996 film Fly Away Home. The film was a highly fictionalized account based on Bill Lishman's autobiography and work with Operation Migration, but both Lishman's real-life migratory experiments teaching birds to migrate and the film used the Easy Riser, due to its low cruising speed, which allowed the birds to pace the aircraft in flight.

Vickers FB5 Gunbus

A replica Vickers FB5 was constructed to appear in the 1986 film Sky Bandits (also released under the title Gunbus) which was about a pair of cowboys who flee the US to escape prison for a bank robbery and end up serving in the RFC during the Great War. The replica, built as a taxiing prop for the film, is currently housed at Sywell Aerodrome in the UK.

Vickers Wellington
The Vickers Wellington features in the 1941 film Target for Tonight.

Nevil Shute's romance Pastoral is a wartime story of a pilot and his crew of a Wellington bomber based at a fictional RAF station called "Hartley Magna".

A Vickers Wellington features in the 1961 comedy film Very Important Person (released in the US as A Coming Out Party). In the film, the central character, a military scientist named Sir Ernest Pease (James Robertson Justice) is taken over Germany during WW2 to test a top-secret apparatus. However the Wellington is hit by anti-aircraft fire and Pease is sucked out through a hole in the fuselage, parachuting into enemy territory and ending up in a POW camp.

The 1968 Czechoslovak film Nebeští jezdci (Sky Riders) about Czechoslovak airmen in RAF Bomber Command featured a Vickers Wellington. It was depicted by a taxiing replica based on an extensively modified Lisunov Li-2. Flight sequences were shot with large scale replicas and the film also incorporated wartime stock footage, including scenes from Target for Tonight.

A haunted Vickers Wellington is the subject of Robert Westall's macabre, and critically appreciated, 1982 short story Blackham's Wimpy.

Irish graphic novelist Garth Ennis chose the Wellington to be the aircraft flown by the Australian crew of RAF Bomber Command in his 2010 graphic novel Happy Valley, set in 1942 during the early phase of the night bombing offensive and one of his Battlefields series.

V-22 Osprey
Two Bell-Boeing CV-22 Ospreys (of only three in the USAF inventory at the time) were filmed in flight at Holloman Air Force Base, New Mexico, in May 2006 for the 2007 Transformers film. This would inspire a host of Transformers toys and characters based on the Osprey including the Decepticons Incinerator and Ruination as well as the Autobots Springer and Blades.

Waco 10
At least seven Waco 10 biplanes were employed in the production of the 1928 film Lilac Time, a romantic drama about a British pilot in the Royal Flying Corps in WW1. The film was directed by George Fitzmaurice and starred Gary Cooper (being a silent film, Cooper did not have to fake a British accent). Wacos played the role of generic RFC planes and three were deliberately crashed during filming of the aerial combat scenes. Dick Grace, only just recovered from injuries he sustained while working on the film Wings the previous year, was the stunt pilot for two of the crash-landing scenes.

Wallis Autogyro
Developed in the 1960s by former RAF Wing Commander Ken Wallis, the Wallis WA-116 Agile was an improved, more stable autogyro design. Following a prototype, five WA-116s were built by Beagle Aircraft at Shoreham, three of which were for evaluation by the British Army Air Corps. In 1966, one of the Beagle-built WA-116s, registered G-ARZB, was modified for use in the 1967 James Bond film You Only Live Twice, dubbed "Little Nellie" and flown by Wallis, doubling for Sean Connery's 007.

Wright Flyer
The Wright brothers' Wright Flyer is featured in the Season Seven episode of The Simpsons "Sideshow Bob's Last Gleaming". In the episode, first aired 26 November 1995, Sideshow Bob steals the Flyer, which is on loan from the Smithsonian Institution, while it is on display at an airshow. He then flies it into a shack from which Krusty the Clown is making a television broadcast to put Krusty off the air; however, instead of demolishing the building the frail Flyer merely bounces off the wall undamaged.

Wright Model B
Several replicas of the Wright Model B were constructed for the filming of the 1978 telemovie The Winds of Kitty Hawk. One of the replicas is now owned and preserved by Wright B Flyers Inc. based in Dayton, Ohio.

XB-51

The Martin XB-51 depicted the fictional Gilbert XF-120 in the 1956 film Toward the Unknown, starring William Holden as a test pilot. On 25 March 1956, the first XB-51 prototype, 46-0685, crashed in sand dunes near Biggs Air Force Base, El Paso, Texas, killing both crew, while staging to Eglin AFB, Florida, for filming of scenes for the motion picture.

Zeppelin
A Zeppelin appears in the 1929 Fox Corporation film The Sky Hawk which was directed by John G. Blystone. The film portrayed an aristocratic Englishman Jack Bardell (played by John Garrick) who joins the Royal Flying Corps during the Great War. In the film, Bardell is badly injured in a crash in France which leaves him with only partial use of his legs. The unclear circumstances surrounding the crash lead him to suffer accusations of cowardice. Determined to reclaim his honour, Bardell secretly rebuilds a derelict aircraft and attaches special stirrups to the rudder pedals so he is able to fly it. He takes off on an un-authorised patrol over London and destroys a Zeppelin raider, restoring his reputation in the process.

A German Zeppelin is shot down in the 1930 Howard Hughes film Hell's Angels.

A bombing raid by a Zeppelin comprises a major plot point in the Elsie McCutcheon novel Summer of the Zeppelin.

Zeppelin-Staaken R.VI
In the 2017 film, Wonder Woman'', a Zeppelin-Staaken R.VI is loaded with 4,500 pounds of bombs filled with poisonous gas intended for London. Steve Trevor destroys it by detonating the payload mid-flight, sacrificing himself.

See also 
 List of fictional spacecraft
 Airborne aircraft carrier
 Aviation accidents and incidents in fiction

References

Notes

Bibliography

Further reading

External links
 Rotary Action guide to helicopters in movies and television

Fiction about transport